= External morphology of Lepidoptera =

External features of butterflies and moths

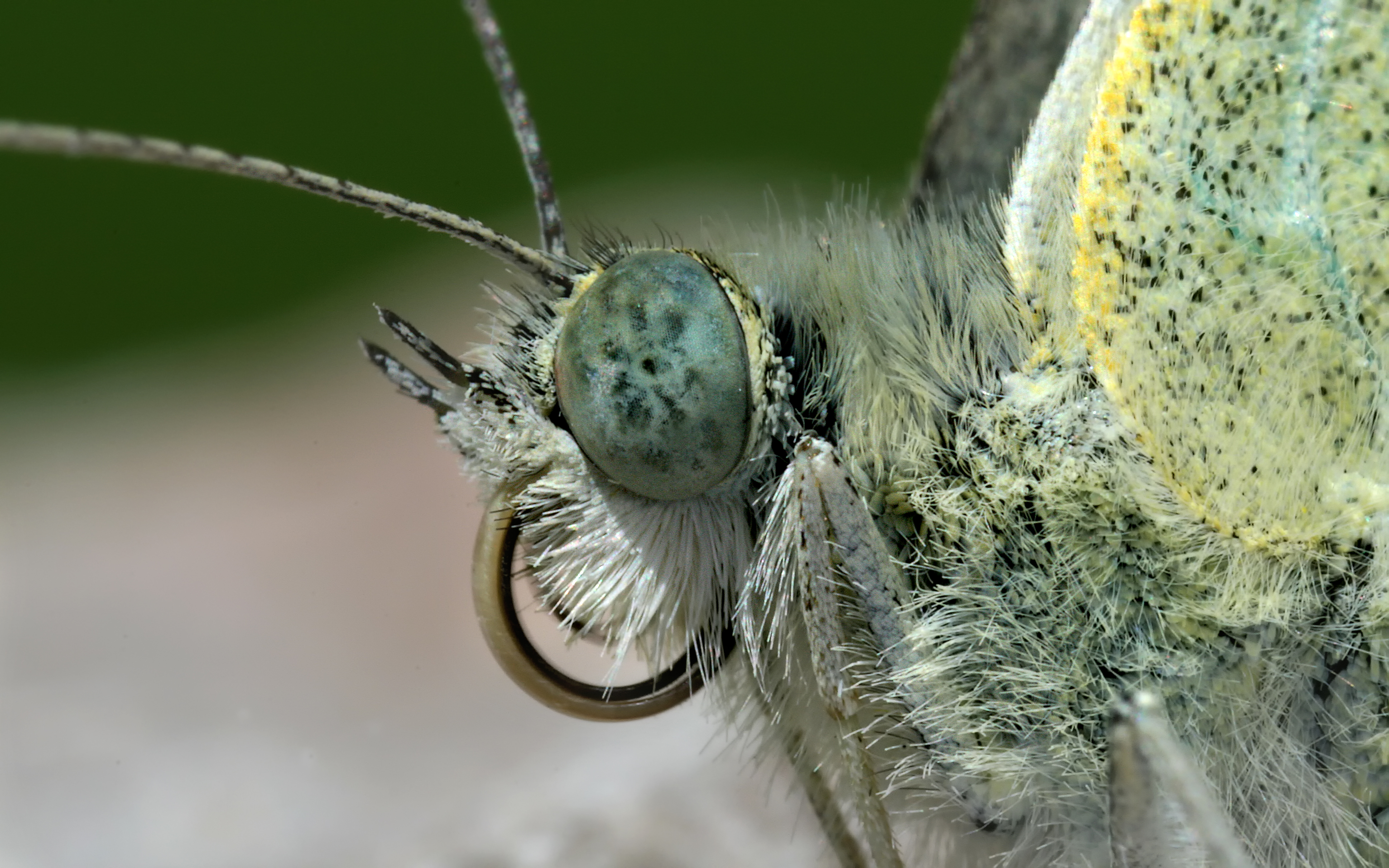
The head of a small white butterfly (Pieris rapae). Note the upward pointing labial palpi on both sides of the coiled proboscis.

Comparison of moth and butterfly dorsal anatomy.

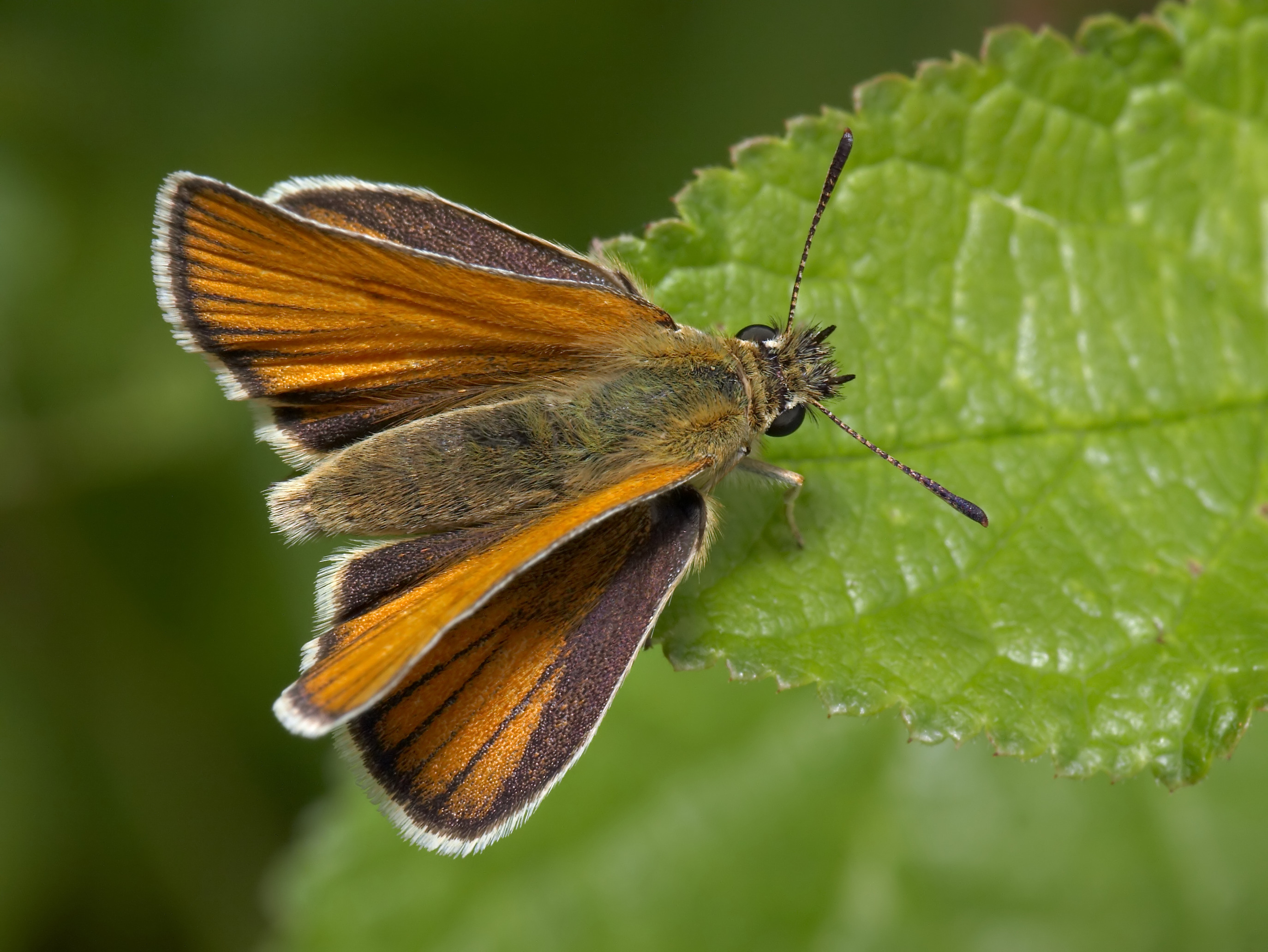
Adult Essex skipper (Thymelicus lineola)

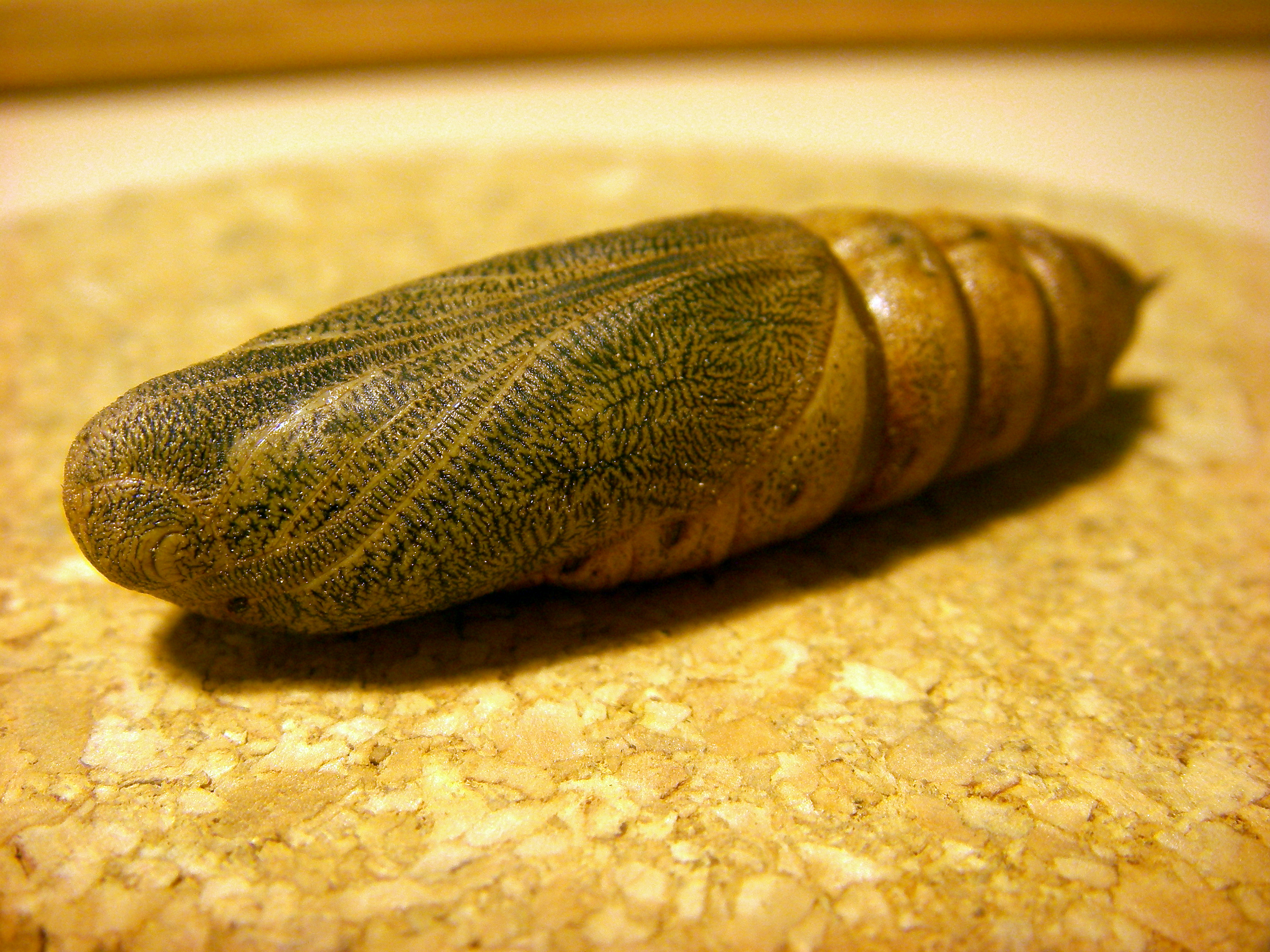
Pupa of a sphingid moth

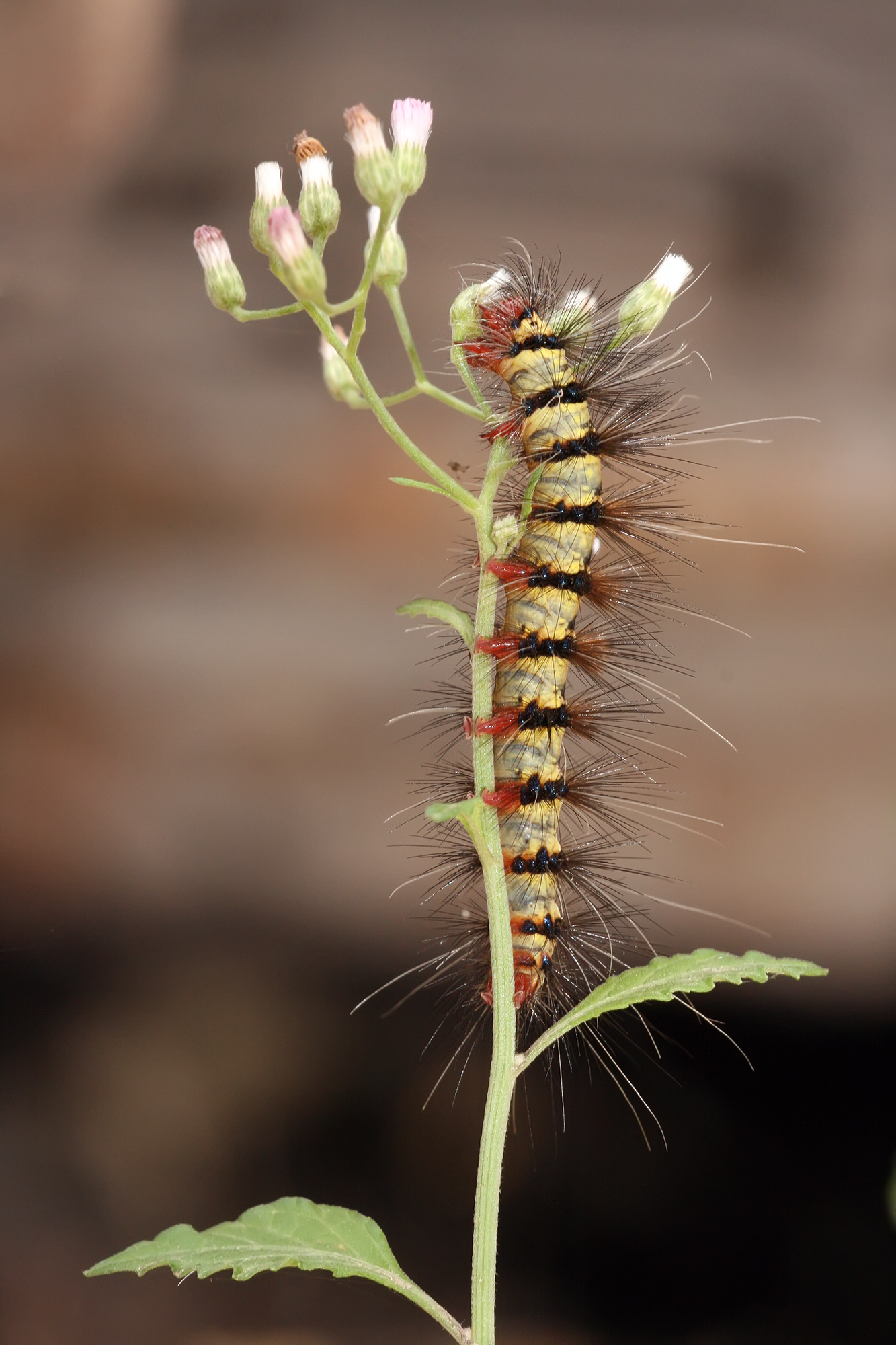
Caterpillar of the subfamily Arctiinae

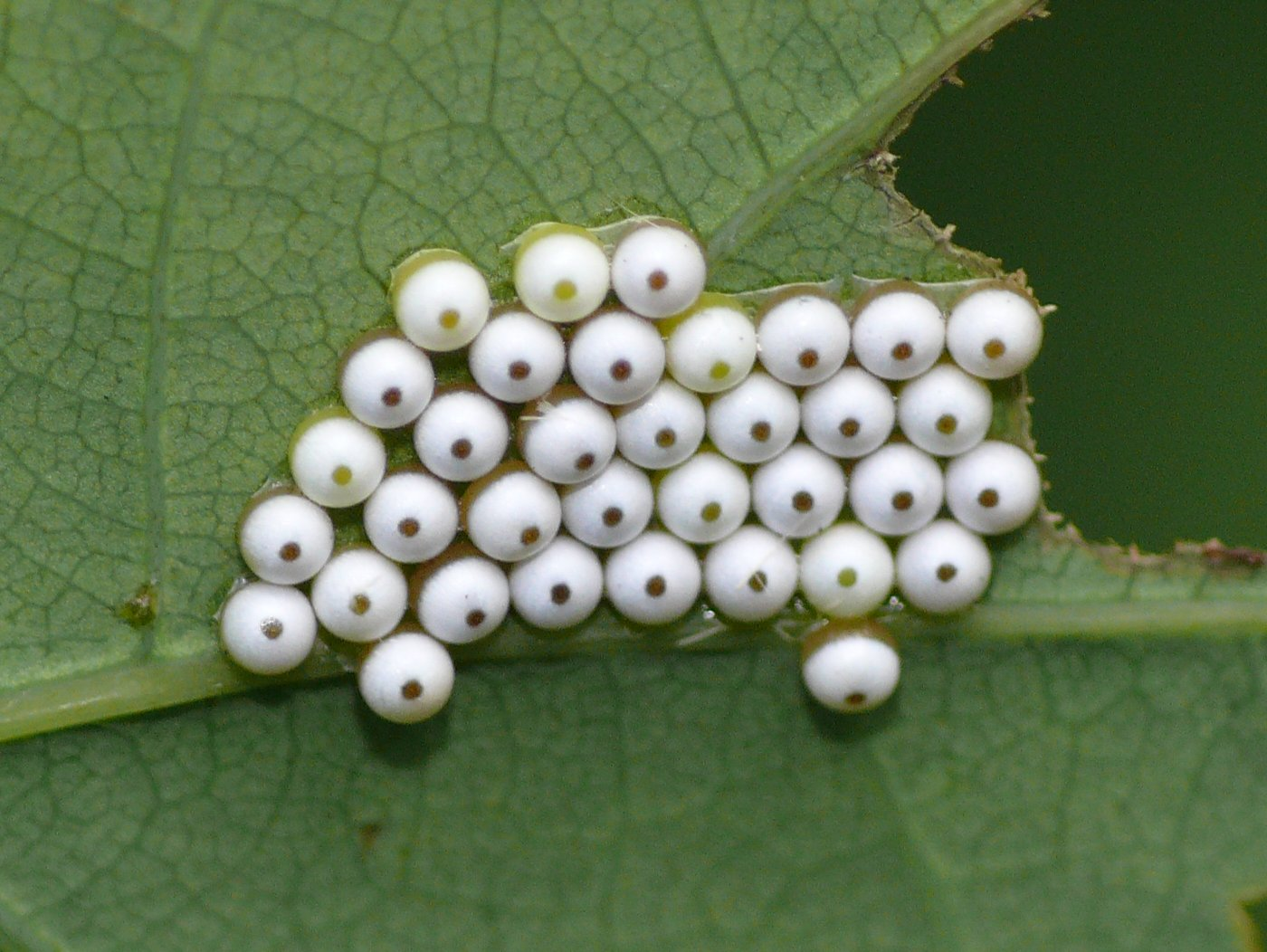
Eggs of the buff-tip (Phalera bucephala), a notodontid moth

The external morphology of Lepidoptera is the physiological structure of the bodies of insects belonging to the order Lepidoptera, also known as butterflies and moths. Lepidoptera are distinguished from other orders by the presence of scales on the external parts of the body and appendages, especially the wings. Butterflies and moths vary in size from microlepidoptera only a few millimetres long, to a wingspan of many inches such as the Atlas moth. Comprising over 160,000 described species, the Lepidoptera possess variations of the basic body structure which has evolved to gain advantages in adaptation and distribution.

Lepidopterans undergo complete metamorphosis, going through a four-stage life cycle: egg, larva or caterpillar, pupa or chrysalis, and imago (plural: imagines) / adult. The larvae – caterpillars – have a toughened (sclerotised) head capsule, chewing mouthparts, and a soft body, that may have hair-like or other projections, three pairs of true legs, and up to five pairs of prolegs. Most caterpillars are herbivores, but a few are carnivores (some eat ants, aphids, or other caterpillars) or detritivores. Larvae are the feeding and growing stages and periodically undergo hormone-induced ecdysis, developing further with each instar, until they undergo the final larval–pupal moult. The larvae of many lepidopteran species will either make a spun casing of silk called a cocoon and pupate inside it, or will pupate in a cell under the ground. In many butterflies, the pupa is suspended from a cremaster and is called a chrysalis.

The adult body has a hardened exoskeleton, except for the abdomen which is less sclerotised. The head is shaped like a capsule with appendages arising from it. Adult mouthparts include a prominent proboscis formed from maxillary galeae, and are adapted for sucking nectar. Some species do not feed as adults, and may have reduced mouthparts, while others have them modified for piercing and suck blood or fruit juices. Mandibles are absent in all except the Micropterigidae which have chewing mouthparts. Adult Lepidoptera have two immobile, multi-faceted compound eyes, and only two simple eyes or ocelli, which may be reduced. The three segments of the thorax are fused together. Antennae are prominent and besides the faculty of smell, also aid navigation, orientation, and balance during flight. In moths, males frequently have more feathery antennae than females, for detecting the female pheromones at a distance. There are two pairs of membranous wings which arise from the mesothoracic (middle) and metathoracic (third) segments; they are usually completely covered by minute scales. The two wings on each side act as one by virtue of wing-locking mechanisms. In some groups, the females are flightless and have reduced wings. The abdomen has ten segments connected with movable inter-segmental membranes. The last segments of the abdomen form the external genitalia. The genitalia are complex and provide the basis for family identification and species discrimination.

The wings, head parts of thorax, and abdomen of Lepidoptera are covered with minute scales, from which feature the order Lepidoptera derives its names, the word lepidos in Ancient Greek meaning "scale". Most scales are lamellar (blade like) and attached with a pedicel, while other forms may be hair like or specialised as secondary sexual characteristics. The lumen, or surface of the lamella, has a complex structure. It gives colour either due to the pigments contained within it or through its three-dimensional structure. Scales provide a number of functions, which include insulation, thermoregulation, and aiding flight, amongst others, the most important of which is the large diversity of vivid or indistinct patterns they provide which help the organism protect itself by camouflage, mimicry, and to seek mates.

== External morphology ==
Parts of an adult butterfly: A: Forewing; B: Antenna; C: Compound eye; D: Proboscis; E: Thorax; F: Leg; G: Abdomen; H: Hindwing; I: Tail

In common with other members of the superorder Holometabola, Lepidoptera undergo complete metamorphosis, going through a four-stage life cycle: egg, larva / caterpillar, pupa / chrysalis, and imago (plural: imagines) / adult.

Lepidopterans range in size from a few millimetres in length, such as in the case of microlepidoptera, to a wingspan of many inches, such as the Atlas moth and the world's largest butterfly Queen Alexandra's birdwing.

=== General body plan ===
The body of an adult butterfly or moth (the imago) has three distinct divisions, called tagmata, connected at constrictions; these tagmata are the head, thorax, and abdomen. Adult lepidopterans have four wings – a forewing and a hindwing on both the left and the right side of the thorax – and, like all insects, three pairs of legs.

The morphological characteristics which distinguish the order Lepidoptera from other insect orders are:

- Head: The head has large compound eyes and, if mouthparts are present, they are almost always a drinking straw-like proboscis.
- Scales: Scales cover the external surface of the body and appendages.
- Thorax: The prothorax is usually reduced.
- Wings: Two pairs of wings are present in almost all taxa. The wings have very few cross veins.
- Abdomen: The posterior abdominal segments are extensively modified for reproduction. Cerci are absent.
- Larva: Lepidoptera larvae are known as caterpillars, and have a well-developed head and mandibles. They can have from zero to five pairs of prolegs, usually four.
- Pupa: The pupae in most species are adecticous (with no functional mandibles in the pupal state) and obtect (with appendages fused or glued to the body), while others are decticous (with functional mandibles present in the pupal state) and exarate (having the antennae, legs, and wings free).

=== Distinguishing taxonomic features ===
The chief characteristics used to classify lepidopteran species, genera, and families are:

- the mouthparts
- the shape and venation of the wings
  - whether the wings are homoneurous (the venation of the forewings and hindwings alike) or heteroneurous (forewings and hindwings different)
  - whether the wings are aculeate (more or less covered with specialized bristles called microsetae) or nonaculeate
  - the type of wing coupling (jugate or frenate)
- the anatomy of the reproductive organs
- the structure of larva and position of primary setae
- whether the pupa is exarate or obtect

The morphological characteristics of caterpillars and pupae used for classification are completely different from that of adults; different classification schemes are sometimes provided separately for classifying adults, larvae, and pupae. The characteristics of immature stages are increasingly used for taxonomic purposes as they provide insights into systematics and phylogenies of Lepidoptera that are not apparent from examination of adults.

== Head ==
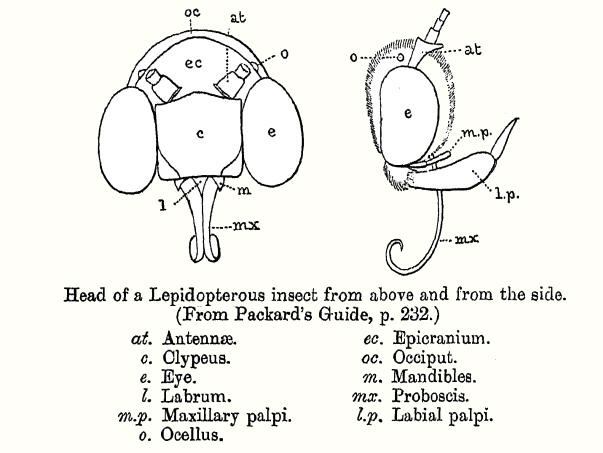
Lepidoptera head illustration from G. F. Hampson's Moths of British India Vol. 1 (1892)

Like all animal heads, the head of a butterfly or moth contains the feeding organs and the major sense organs. The head typically consists of two antennae, two compound eyes, two palpi, and a proboscis. Lepidoptera have ocelli which may or may not be visible. They also have sensory structures called chaetosemata, the functions of which are largely unknown. The head is filled largely by the brain, the sucking pump, and its associated muscle bundles. Unlike the adults, the larvae have one-segmented mandibles.

The head capsule is well sclerotised and has a number of sclerites or plates, separated by sutures. The sclerites are difficult to distinguish from sulci (singular – sulcus) which are secondary thickenings. The regions of the head have been divided into a number of areas which act as a topographical guide for description by lepidopterists but cannot be discriminated in terms of their development. The head is covered by hair-like or lamellar scales and found either as tufts on the frons or vertex (referred to as rough-scaled) or pressed close to the head (referred to as smooth-scaled).

The sensory organs and structures on the head show great variety, and the shape and form of these structures, as also their presence or absence, are important taxonomic indicators for classifying taxa into families.

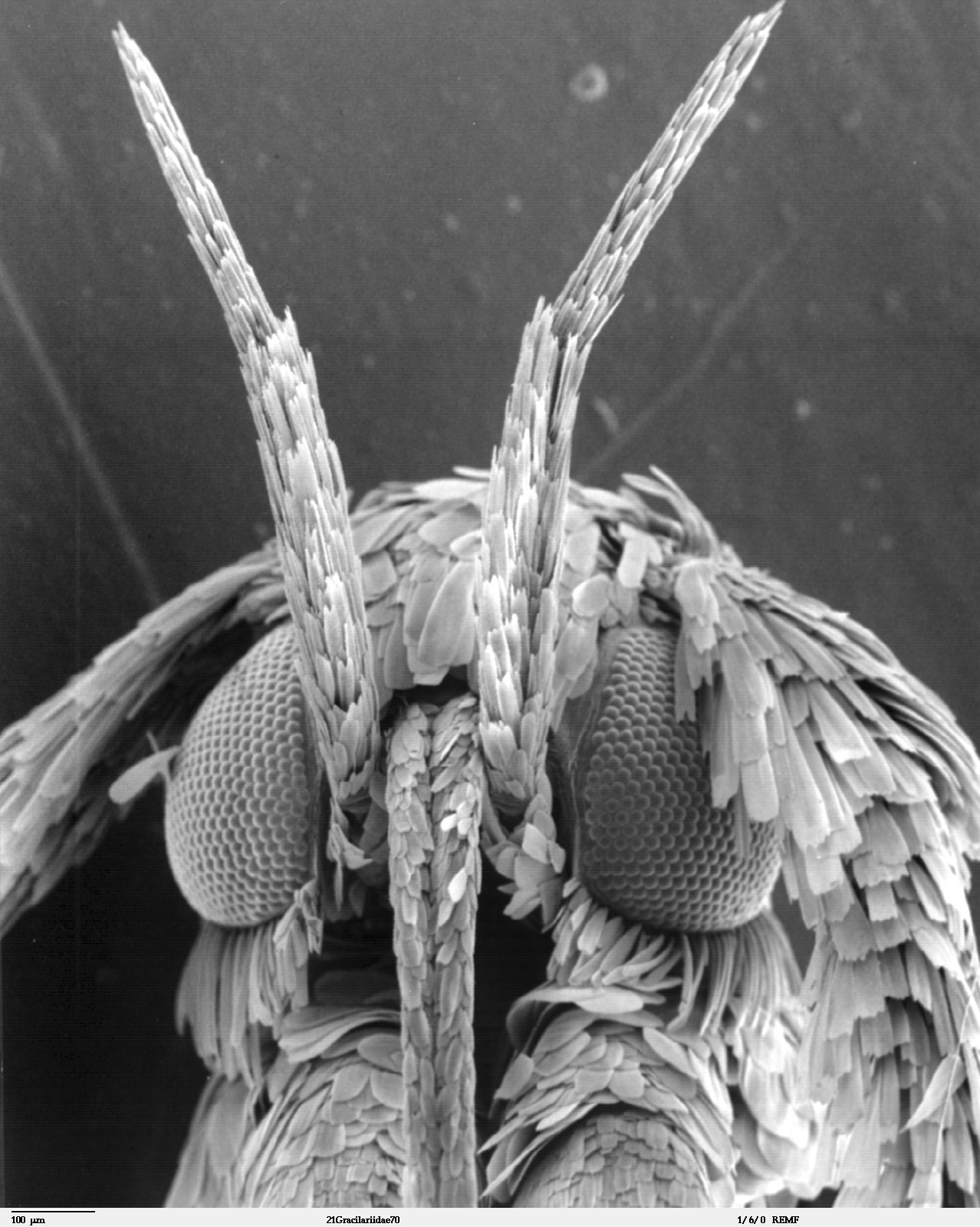
Head of a moth of family Gracillariidae showing extent of scales on the head

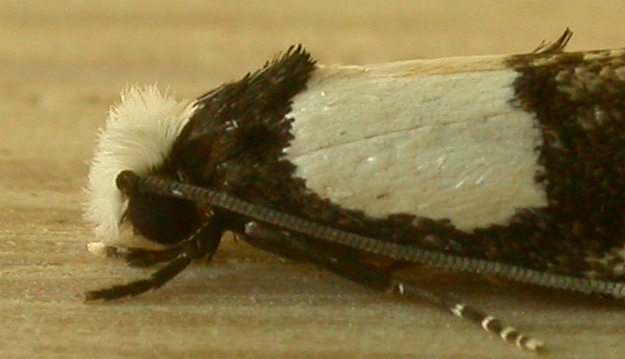
Rough-scaled head of moth Monopis icterogastra (family Tineidae)

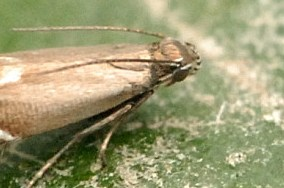
Smooth-scaled head of moth Glyphipterix simpliciella (family Glyphipterigidae)

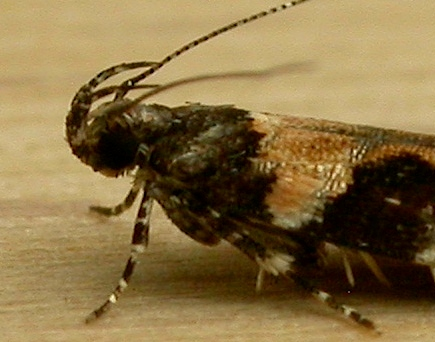
Smooth-scaled head of moth Stegasta variana (family Gelechiidae)

=== Antennae ===
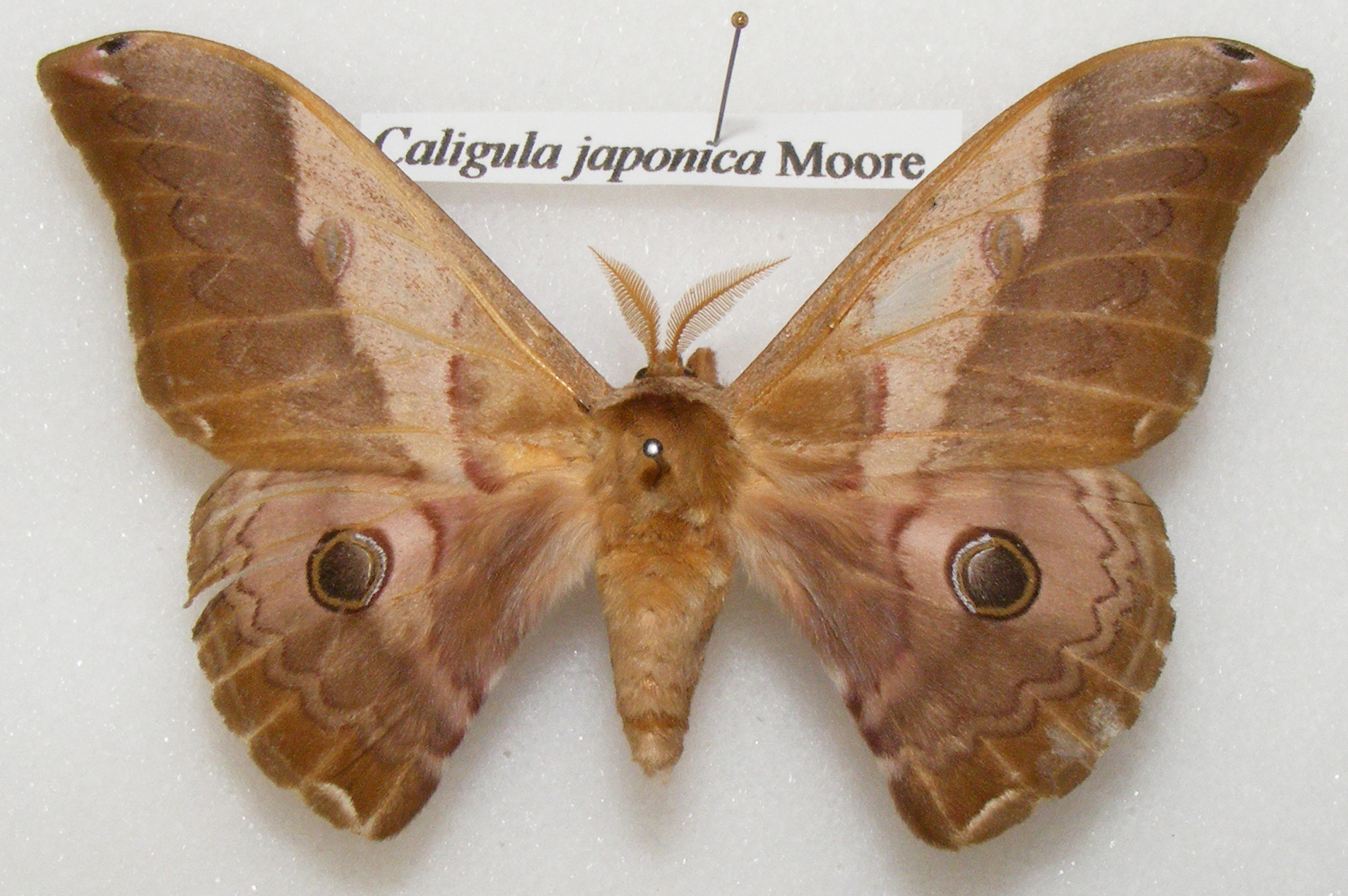
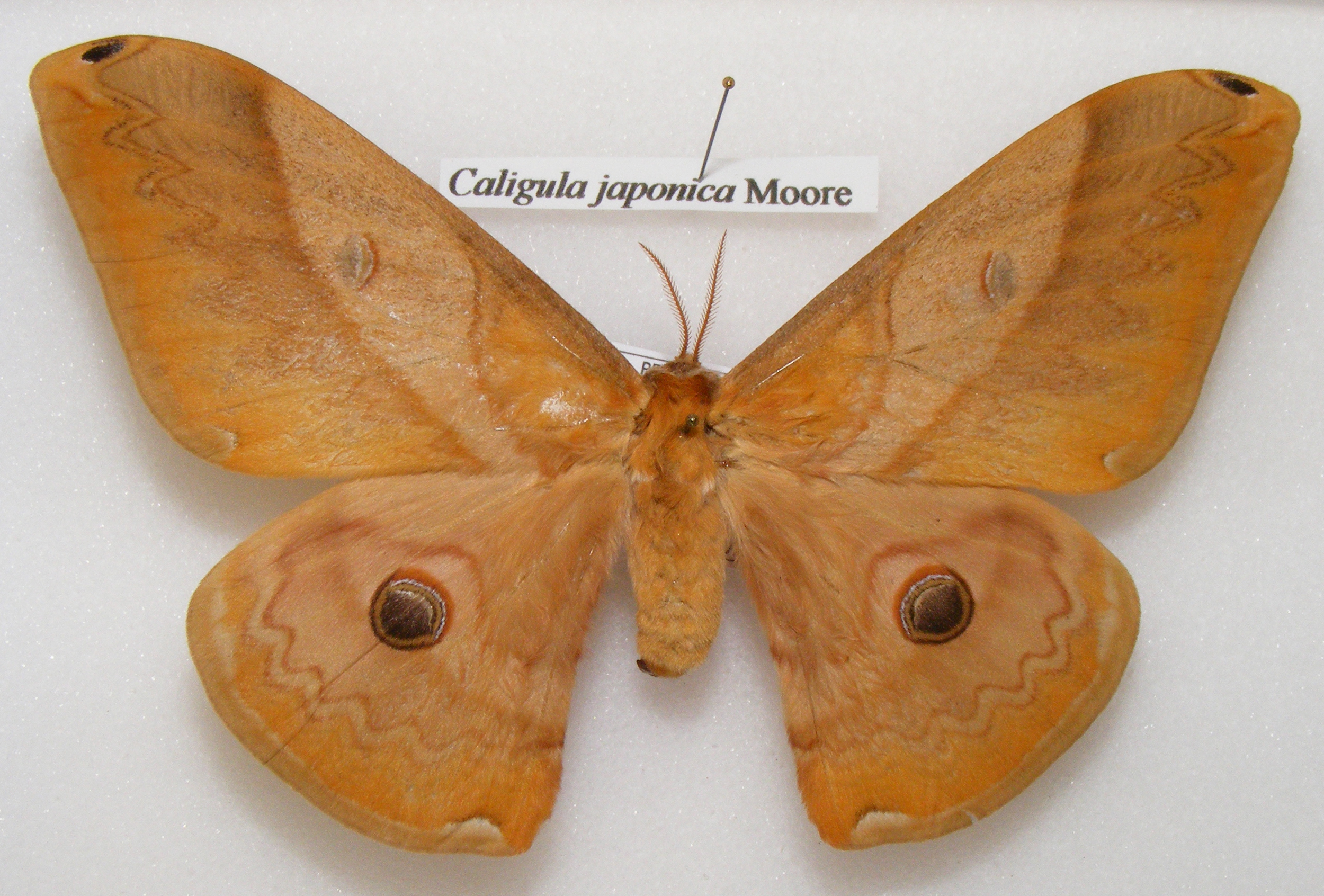
Sexual dimorphism in antennae in Caligula japonica family Saturniidae: feathery antennae of male (left) and linear form in female (right)

Antennae are prominent paired appendages that project forwards between the animal's eyes and consist of a number of segments. In the case of butterflies, their length varies from half the length of the forewing to three-quarters of the length of the forewing. The antennae of butterflies are either slender and knobbed at the tip and, in the case of the Hesperiidae, are hooked at the tip. In some butterfly genera such as Libythea and Taractrocera the knob is hollowed underneath. Moth antennae are either filiform (thread like), unipectinate (comb like), bipectinate (feather like), hooked, clubbed, or thickened. Bombyx mandarina is an example with bipectinate antennae. Some moths have knobbed antennae akin to those of butterflies, such as the family Castniidae.

Antennae are the primary organs of olfaction (smell) in Lepidoptera. The antenna surface is covered with large numbers of olfactory scales, hairs, or pits; as many as 1,370,000 are found on the antennae of a monarch. Antennae are extremely sensitive; the feathered antennae of male moths from the Saturniidae, Lasiocampidae, and many other families are so sensitive that they can detect the pheromones of female moths from distances of up to 2 km (1.2 mi) away. Lepidoptera antennae can be angled in many positions. They help the insect in locating the scent and can be considered to act as a kind of "olfactory radar". In moths, males frequently have antennae which are more feathery than those of the females, for detecting the female pheromones at a distance. Since females do not need to detect the males, they have simpler antennae. Antennae have also been found to play a role in the time-compensated sun compass orientation in migratory monarch butterflies.

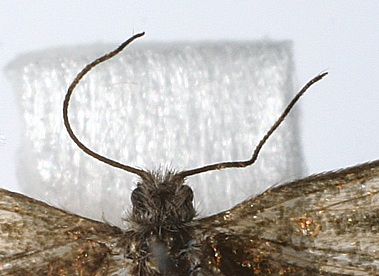
Filiform antennae – Eriocrania cicatricella (Eriocraniidae)

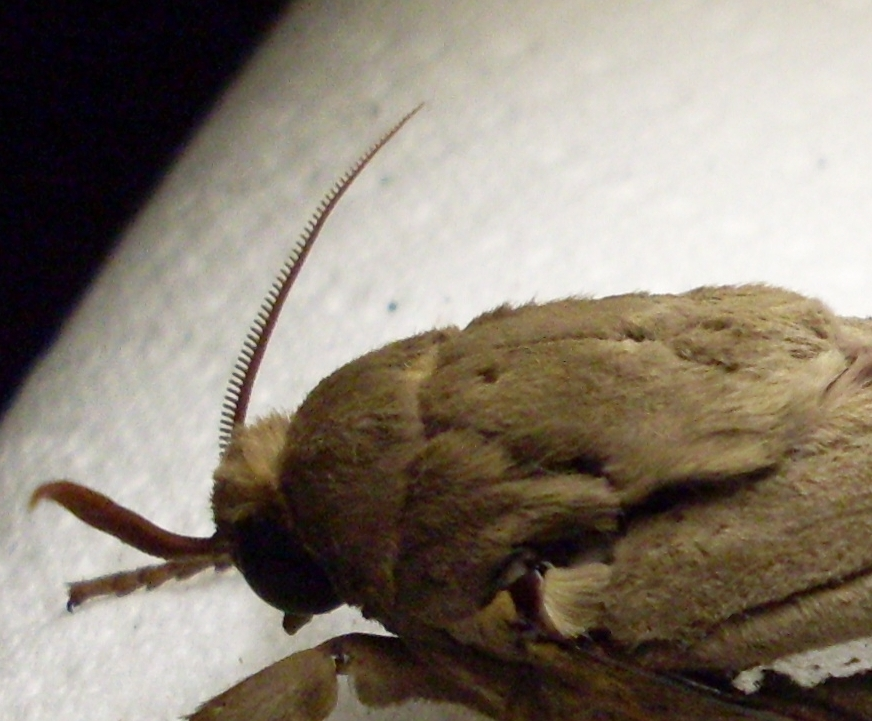
Unipectinate antennae – Abantiades barcas (Hepialidae)

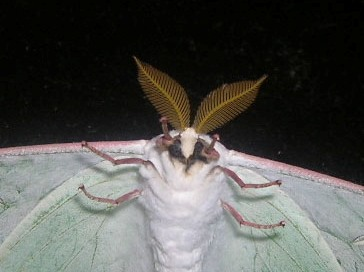
Bipectinate antennae – Actias artemis (Saturniidae)

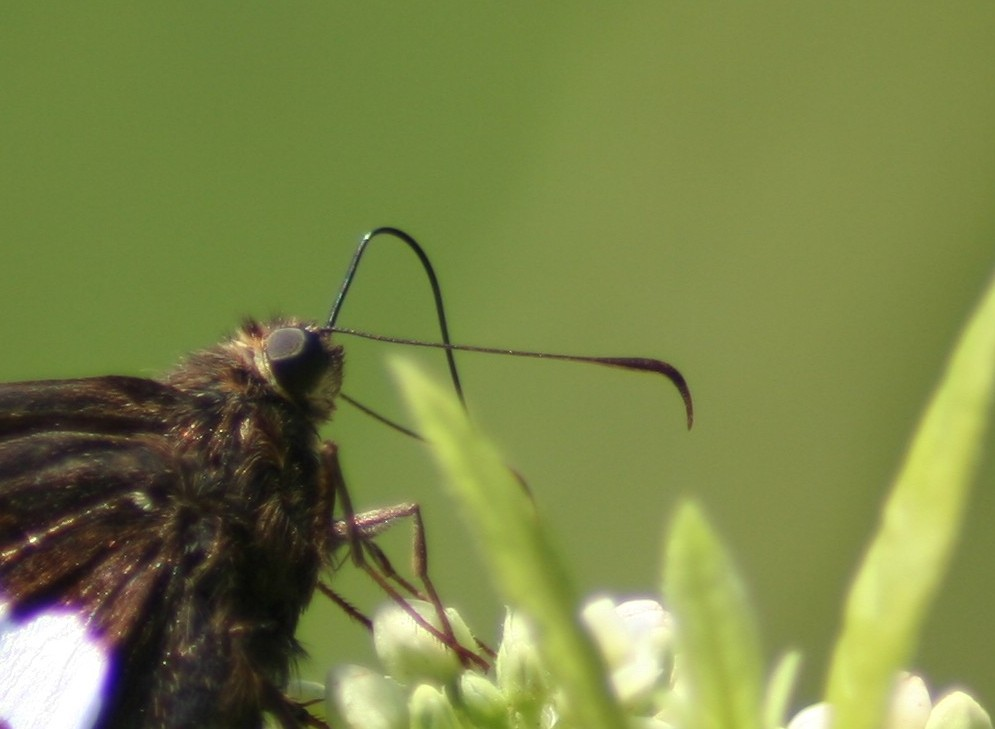
Hooked antennae – Epargyreus clarus (Hesperiidae)

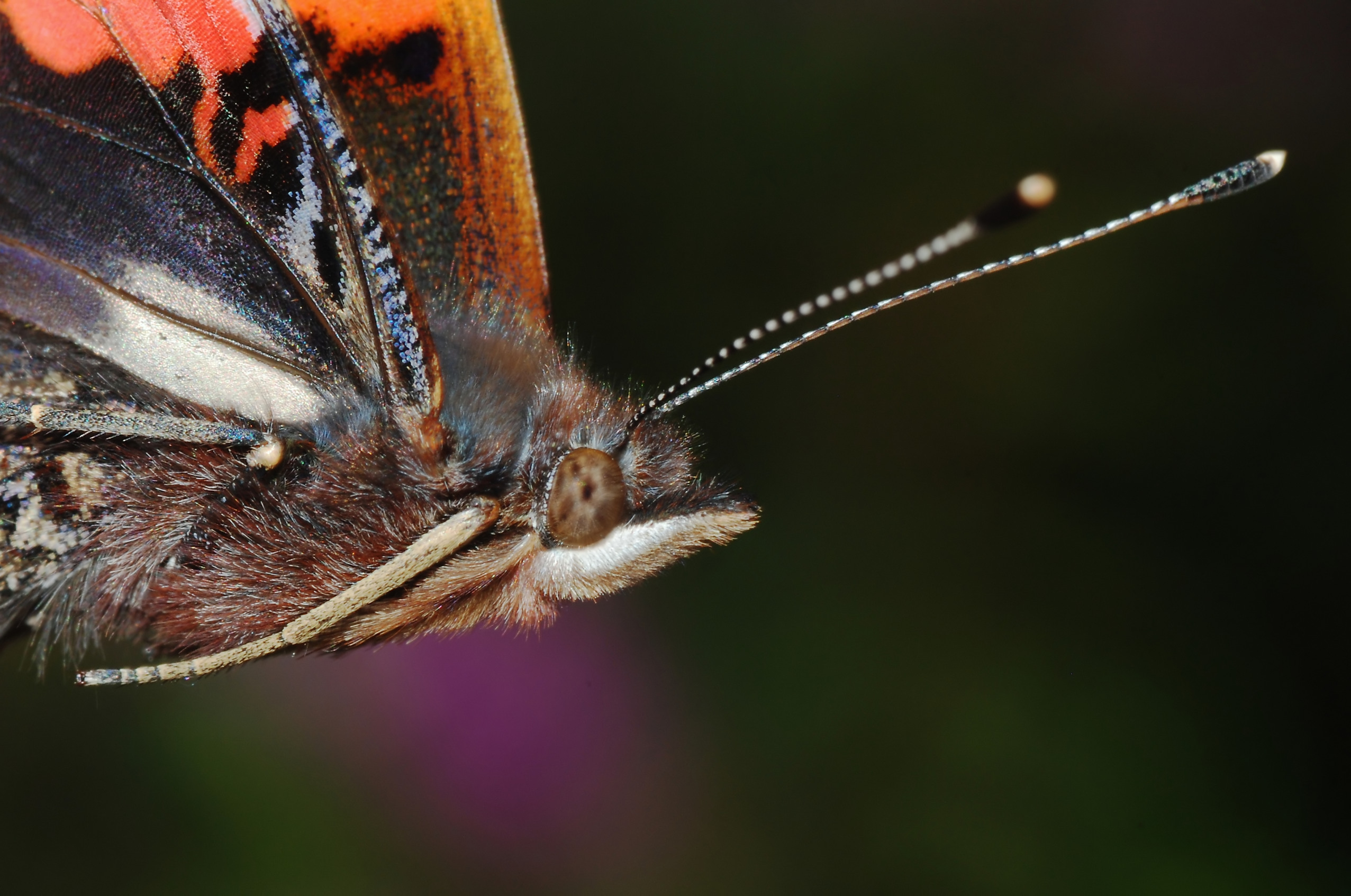
Clubbed antennae – Vanessa atalanta (Nymphalidae)

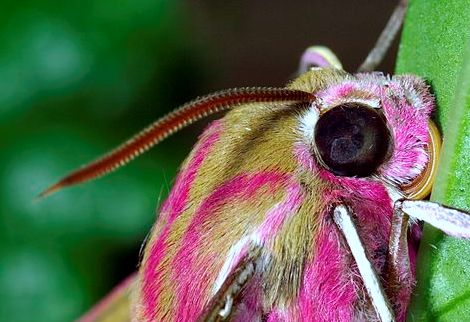
Thickened antennae – Deleiphila elpenor (Sphingidae)

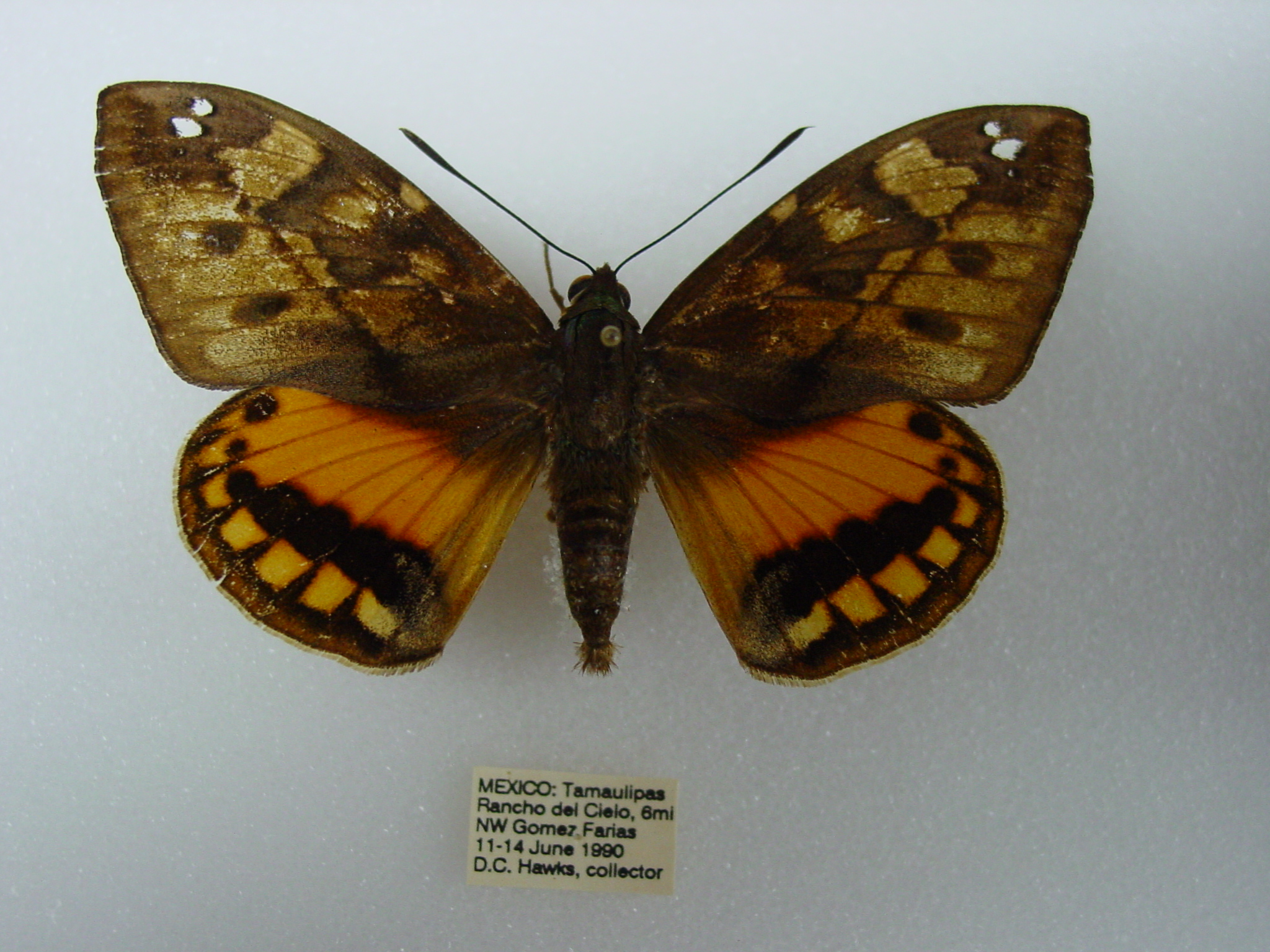
Clubbed moth antennae – Athis inca (Castniidae)

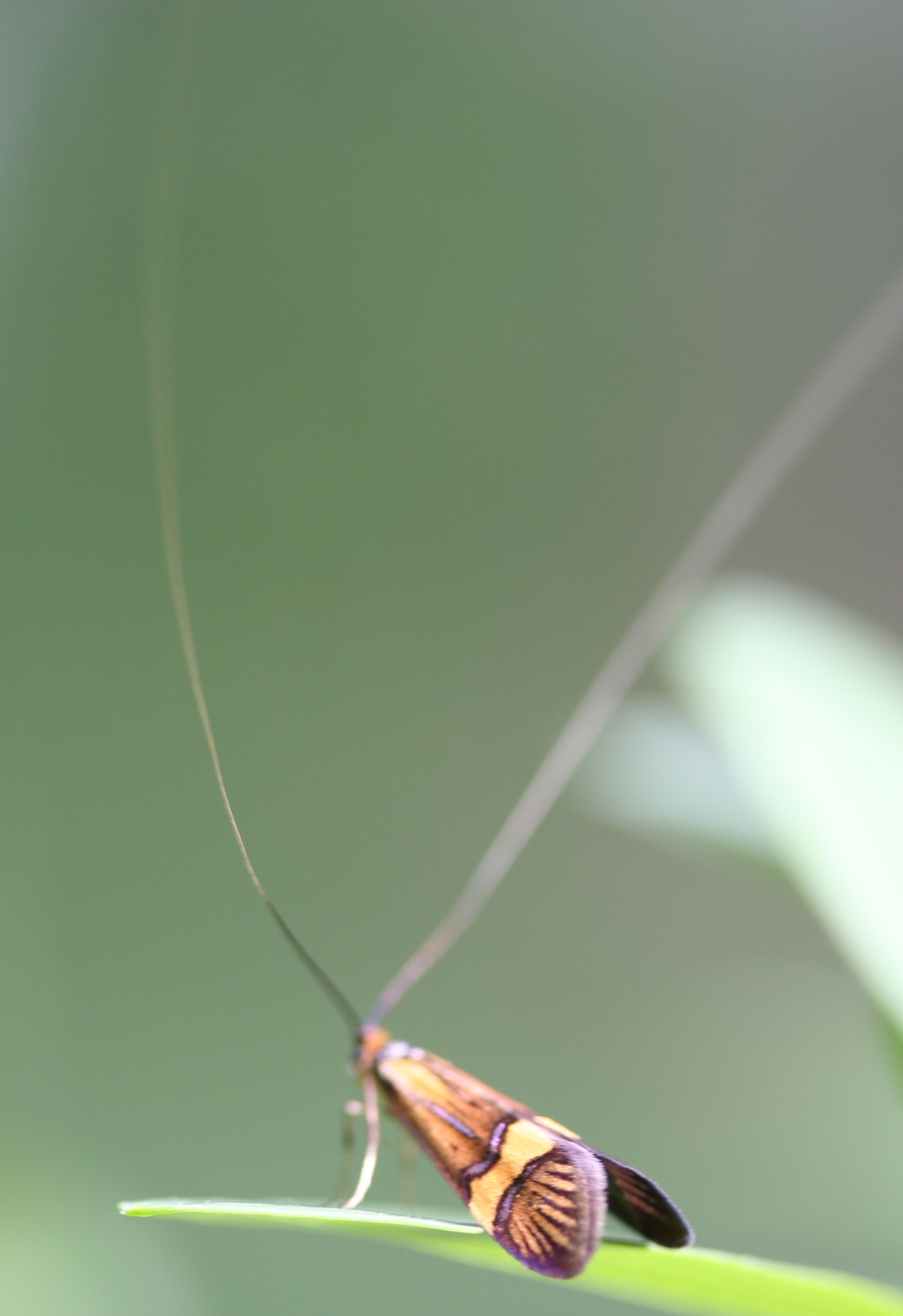
Longhorn moth
(Nemophora degeerella Adelidae) has antennae up to five times the length of its wings.

=== Eyes ===
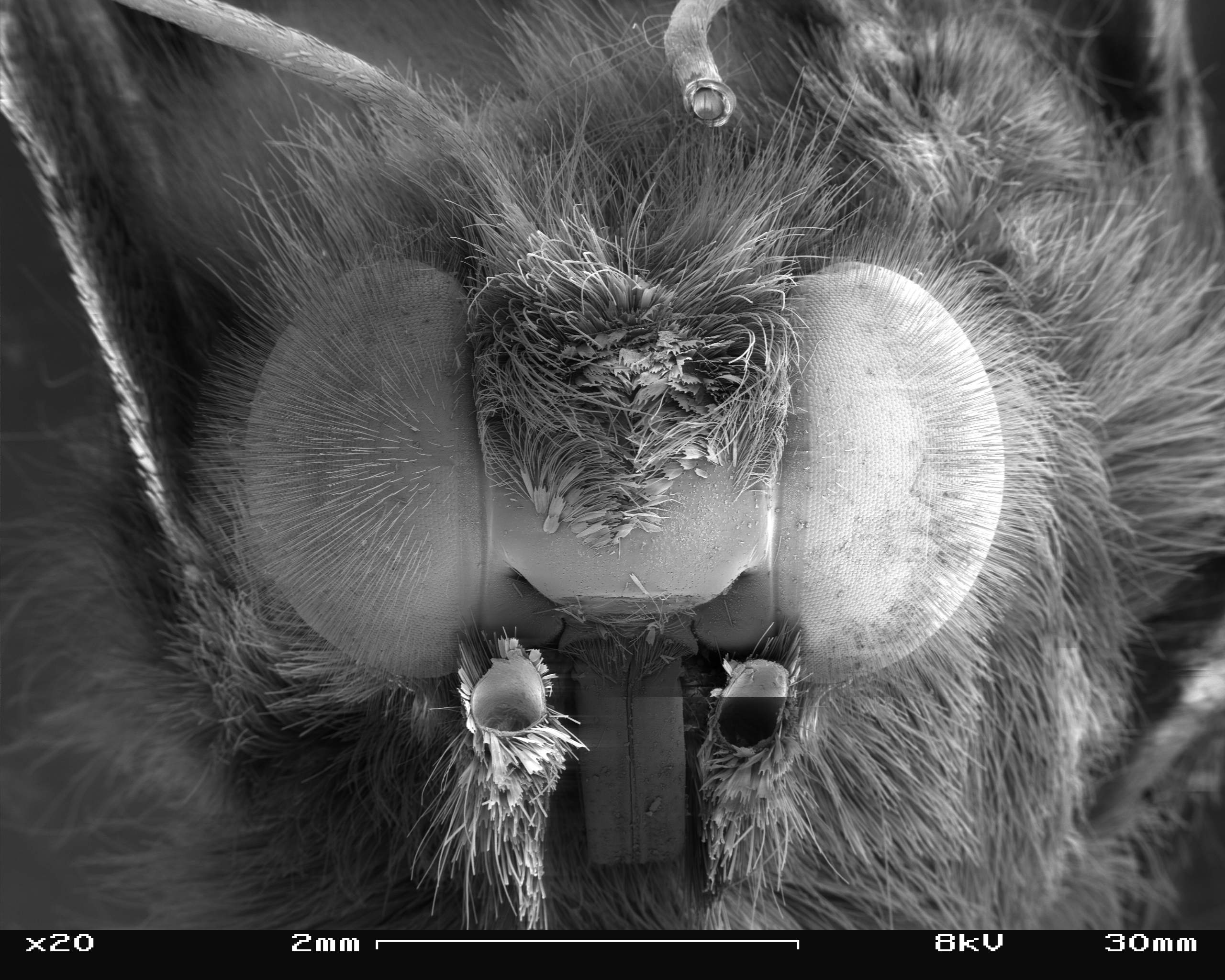
Front view of the compound eyes of Aglais io.

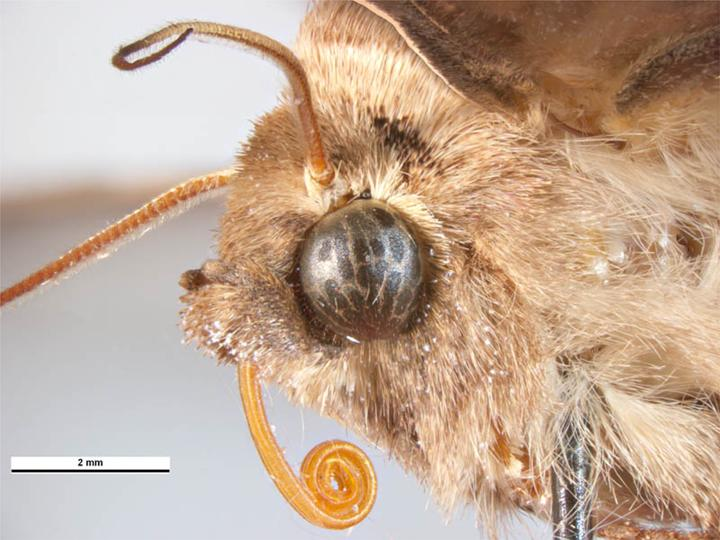
Ocellus of Mythimna unipuncta seen to the right of the base of the antenna, in close contact with the compound eye.

Lepidoptera has two large, immovable compound eyes, which consist of a large number of facets or lenses, each connected to a lens-like cylinder that is attached to a nerve leading to the brain. Each eye may have up to 17,000 individual light receptors (ommatidia), which in combination provide a broad mosaic view of the surrounding area. One tropical Asian family, the Amphitheridae, has compound eyes divided into two distinct segments. The eyes are usually smooth but may be covered by minute hairs. The eyes of butterflies are usually brown, golden brown, or even red as in the case of some species of skippers.

While most insects have three simple eyes, or ocelli, only two ocelli are present in all species of Lepidoptera, except a few moths, one on each side of the head near the edge of the compound eye. On some species, sense organs called chaetosemata are found near the ocelli. The ocelli are not homologous to the simple eyes of caterpillars which are differently named as stemmata. The ocelli of Lepidoptera are reduced externally in some families; where present, they are unfocussed, unlike stemmata of larvae which are fully focussed. The utility of ocelli is not understood at present.

Butterflies and moths can see ultraviolet (UV) light and wing colors and patterns are principally observed by Lepidoptera in these wavelengths of light. The patterns seen on their wing under UV light differ considerably from those seen in normal light. The UV patterns act as visual cues that help differentiate between species for mating. Studies have been carried out on Lepidoptera (mostly butterflies) wing patterns illuminated by UV light.

=== Palpi ===
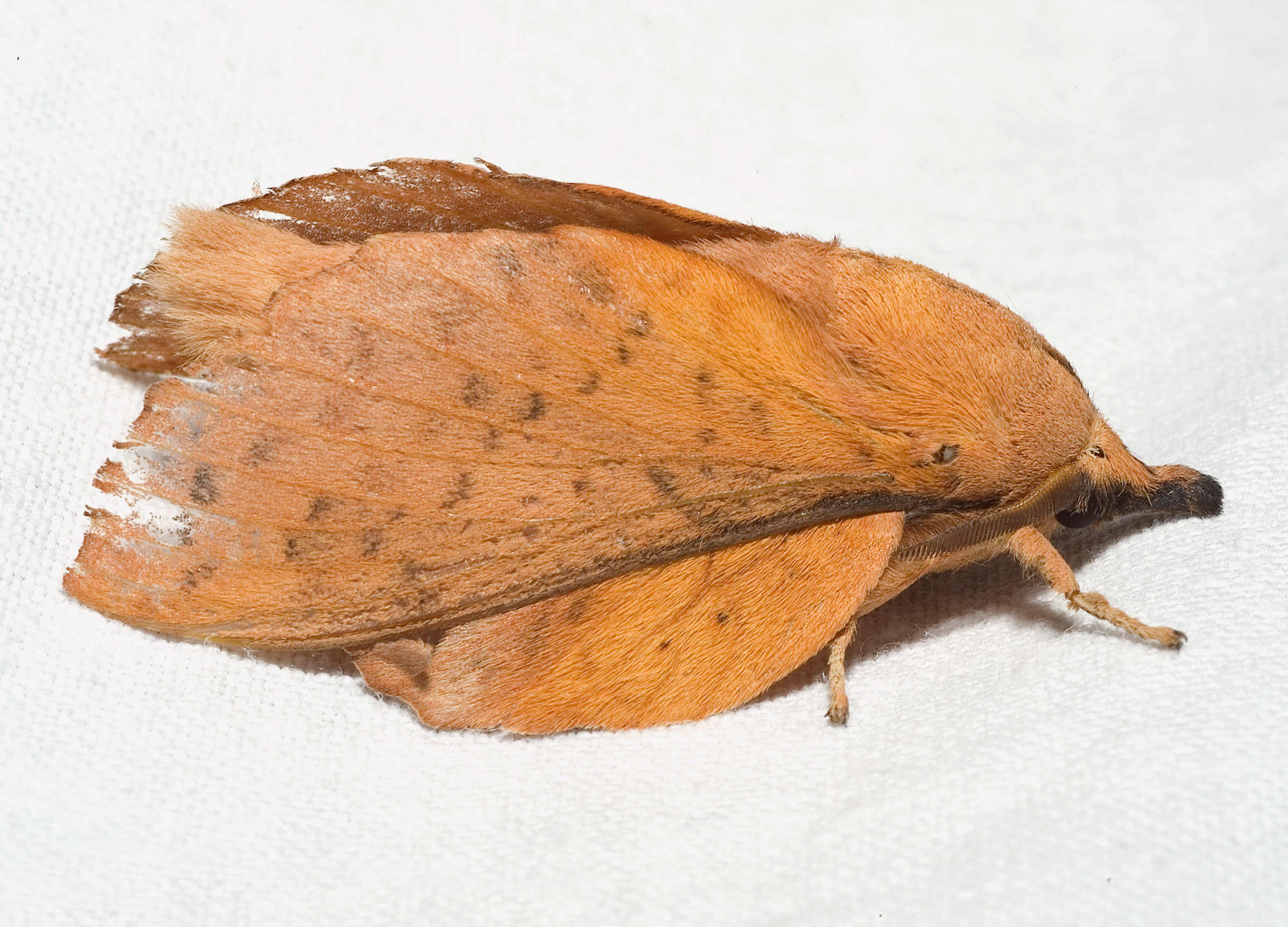
Gastropacha populifolia (family Lasiocampidae) with modified mouthparts

Typically, the labial palpi are prominent, three-segmented, springing from under the head and curving up in front of the face. There is great variation in morphology of labial palpi in different families of Lepidoptera; sometimes the palpi are separate and sometimes they are connivent and form a beak, but they are always independently movable. In other cases, the labial palpi may not be erect but porrect (projecting forward horizontally). Palpi consist of a short basal segment, a comparatively long central segment, and a narrow terminal portion. The first two segments are densely scaled and may be hirsute; the terminal segment is bare. The terminal segment may be blunt or pointed; it may project straight or at an angle from the second segment inside which it may be concealed.

=== Mouthparts ===
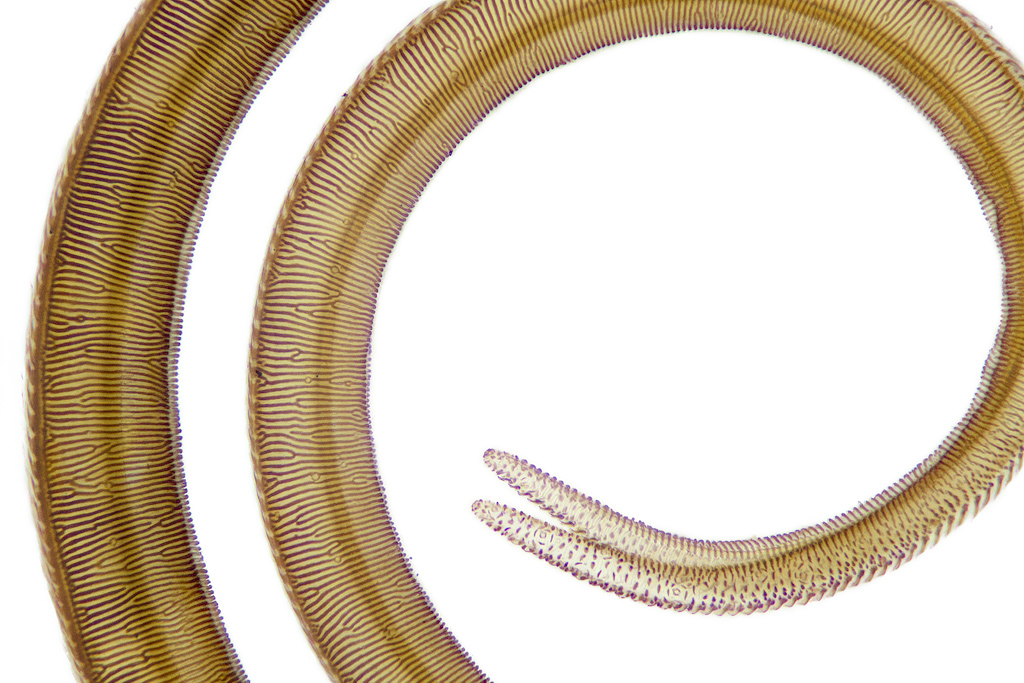
Butterfly proboscis, showing the structure of the two galeae that comprise it.

Legend: Section of mouthparts of Lepidoptera. a: pilifer (labrum); b: epipharynx (labrum); c: galea (maxilla); d: trachea; e: nerve; f: muscles; g: food canal; h: labium; i: labial palp

While mandibles or jaws (chewing mouthparts) are only present in the caterpillar stage, the mouthparts of most adult Lepidoptera mainly consist of the sucking kind; this part is known as the proboscis or haustellum. A few Lepidoptera species have reduced mouthparts and do not feed in the adult state. Others, such as the basal family Micropterigidae, have chewing mouthparts.

The proboscis (plural – proboscises) is formed from maxillary galeae and is adapted for sucking nectar. It consists of two tubes held together by hooks and separable for cleaning. Each tube is inwardly concave, thus forming a central tube up which moisture is sucked. Suction is effected through the contraction and expansion of a sac in the head. The proboscis is coiled under the head when the insect rests and extended only when feeding. The maxillary palpi are reduced and even vestigial. They are conspicuous; five are segmented in some of the more basal families and are often folded.

The shape and dimensions of the proboscis have evolved to give different species a wider and, therefore, more advantageous diet. There is an allometric scaling relationship between body mass of Lepidoptera and length of proboscis from which an interesting adaptive departure is the unusually long-tongued sphinx moth Xanthopan morganii praedicta. Charles Darwin predicted the existence and proboscis length of this moth before its discovery based on his knowledge of the long-spurred Madagascan star orchid Angraecum sesquipedale.

There are primarily two feeding guilds in Lepidoptera – the nectarivorous who obtain the majority of their nutritional requirements from floral nectar and those of the frugivorous guild who feed primarily on juices of rotting fruit or fermenting tree sap. There are substantial differences between the morphology of the proboscises of both feeding guilds. Hawkmoths (family Sphingidae) have elongated proboscises, which enable them to feed on and pollinate flowers with long tubular corollas. Besides this, some taxa (especially noctuid moths) have evolved different proboscis morphologies. Certain noctuid species have developed piercing mouthparts; the proboscis has sclerotized scales on the tip with which to pierce and suck blood or fruit juices. Proboscises in some Heliconius species have evolved to consume solids such as pollen. Some other moths, mostly noctuids, have modified proboscises to suit their mode of nutrition – lachryphagy (feeding on tears of sleeping birds). The proboscises often have sharp apices and a host of barbs and spurs on the stem.

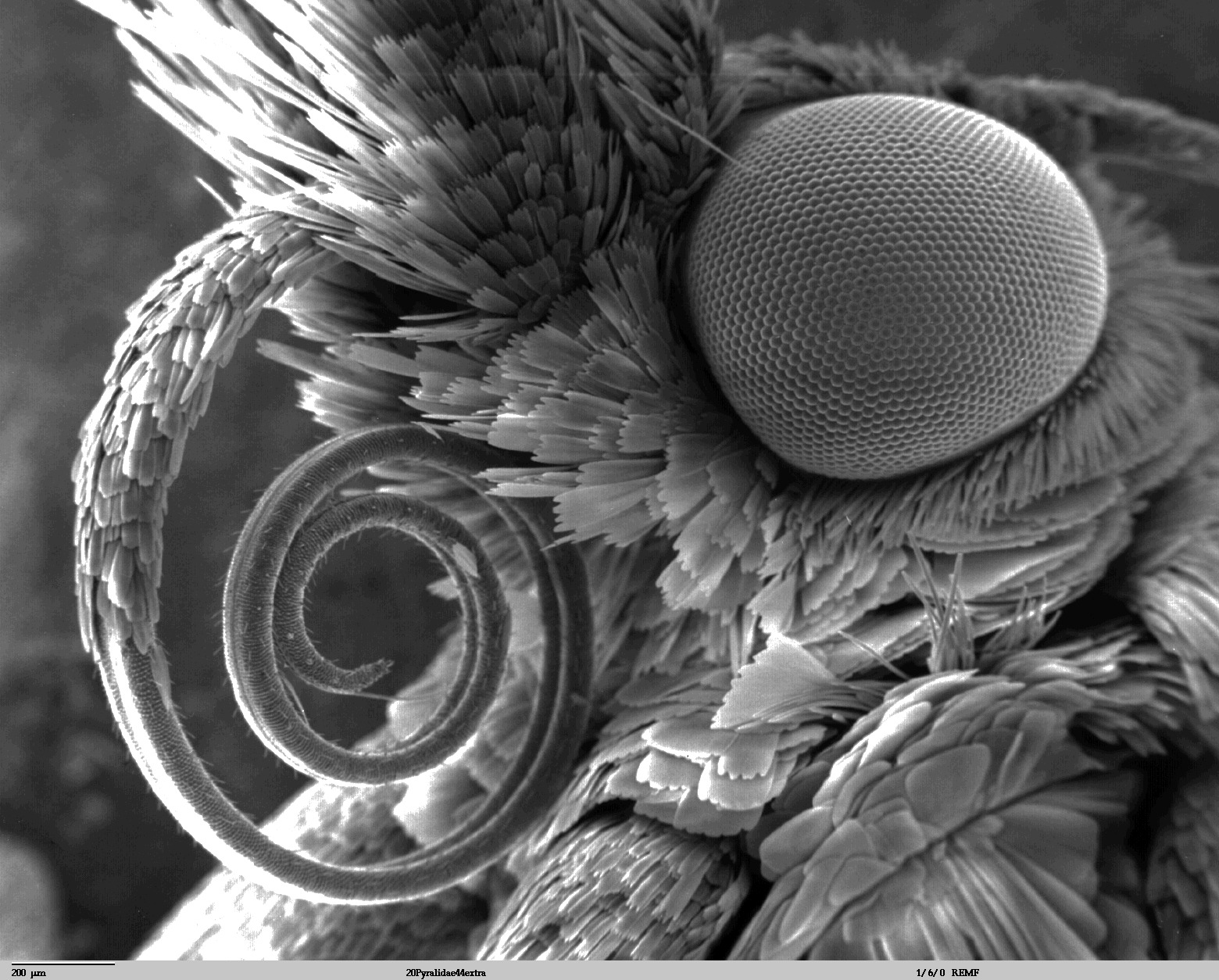
Scanning electron micrograph of the proboscis of a moth from family Pyralidae

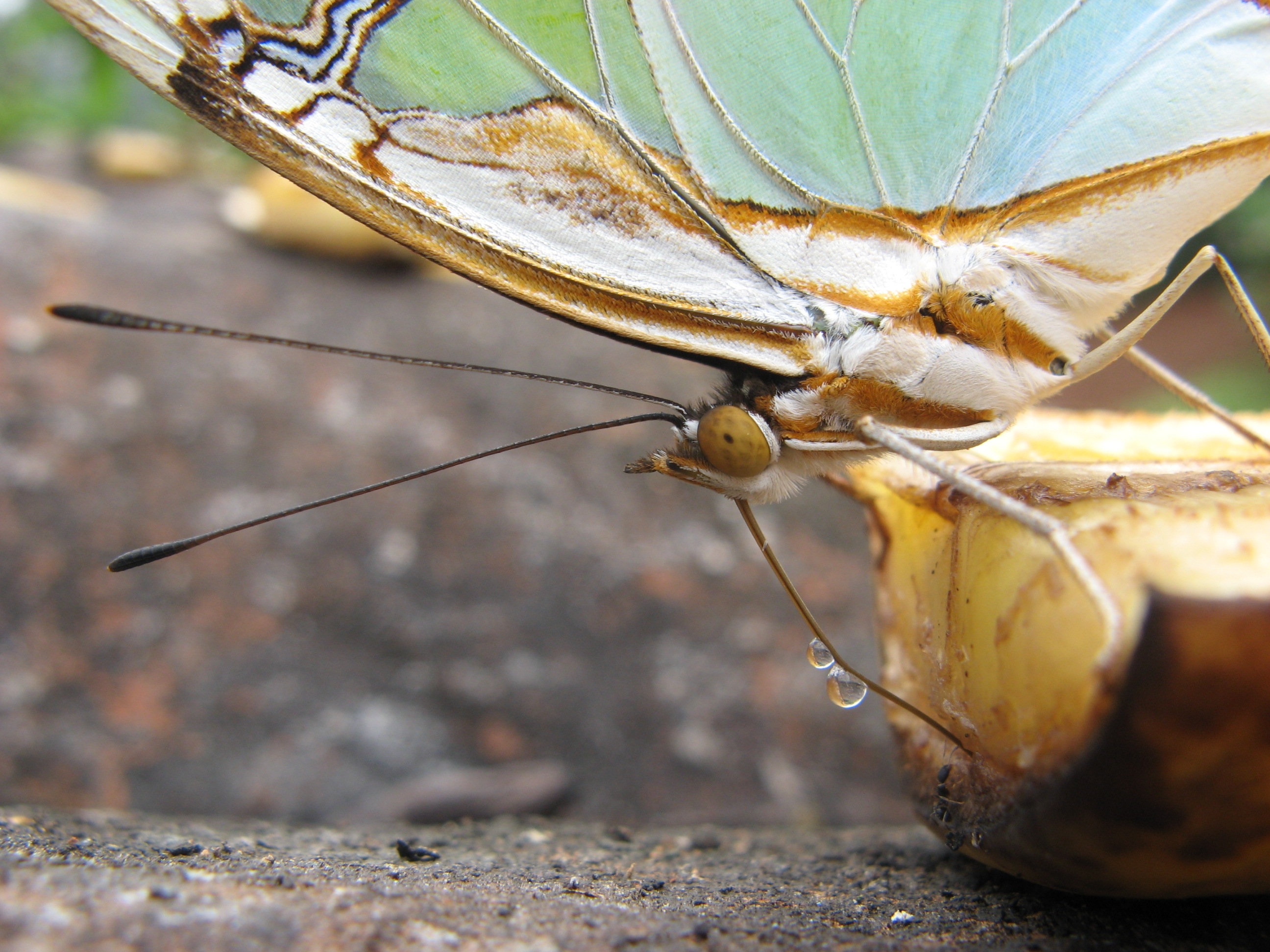
A nymphalid butterfly sucking on a banana

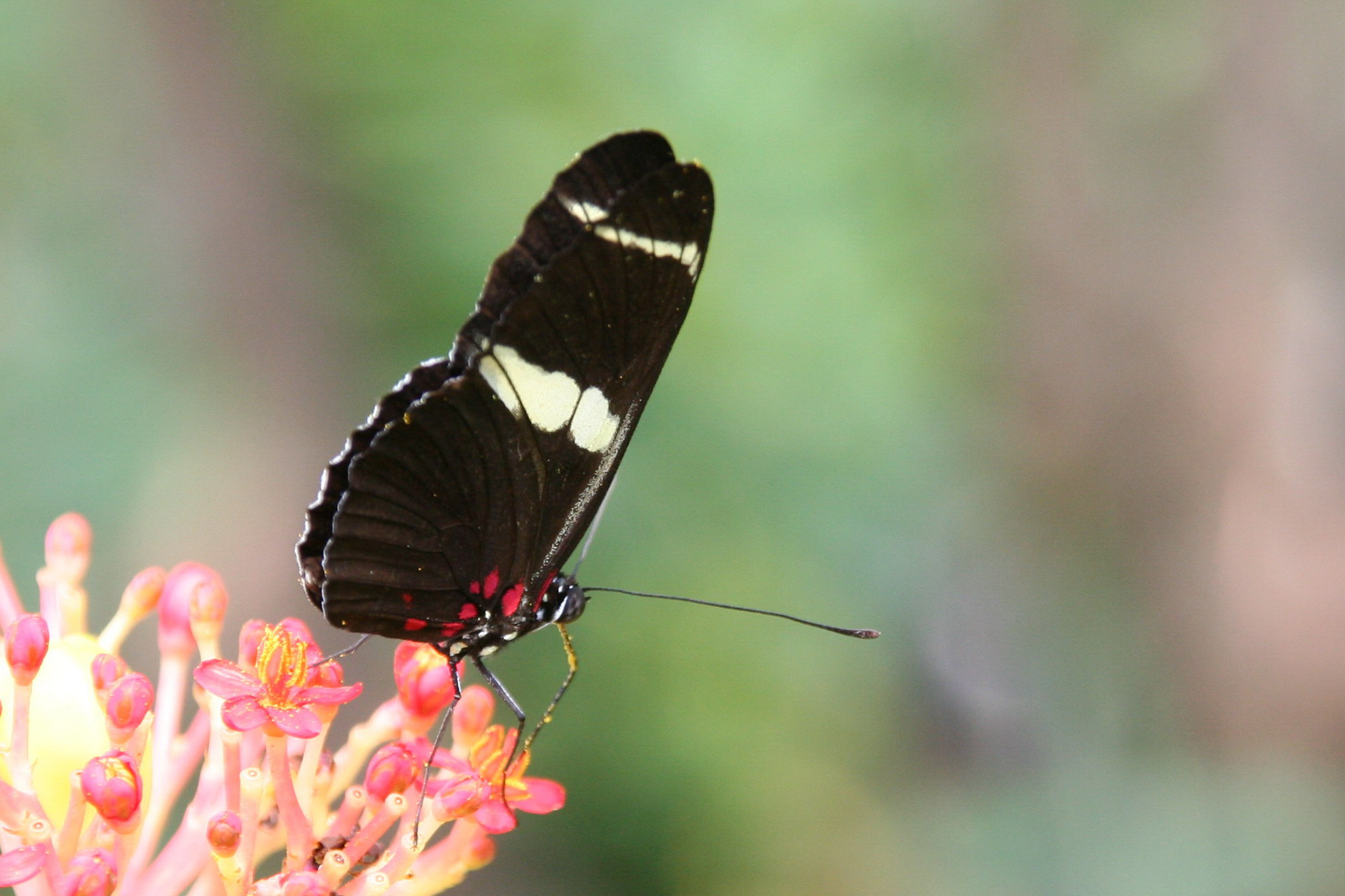
Sara longwing (Heliconius sara), one of many Heliconius species known to feed on pollen, with pollen on its proboscis

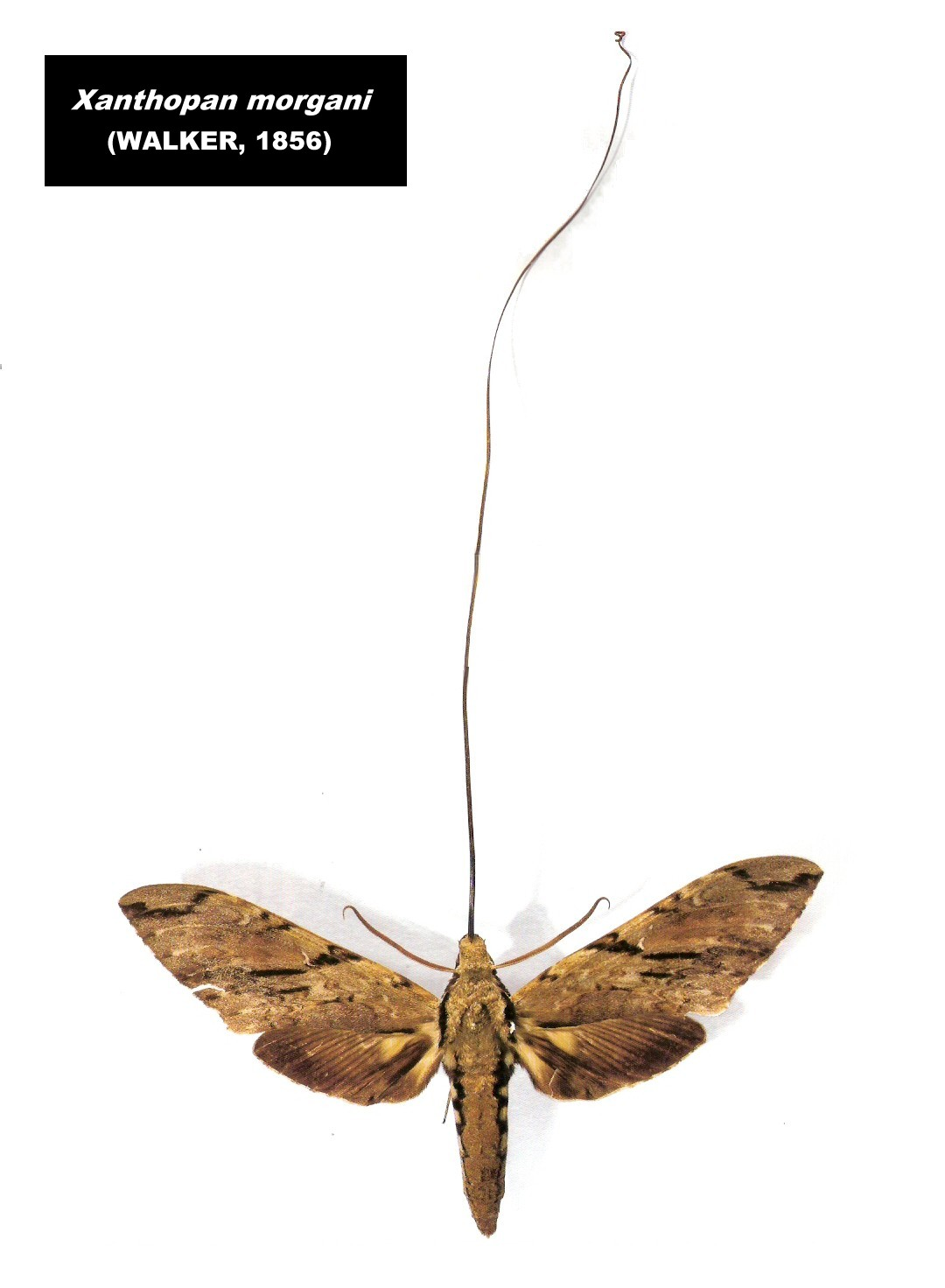
Xanthopan morganii, an African sphingid, has a foot-long proboscis adapted for feeding from the orchid Angraecum sesquipedale

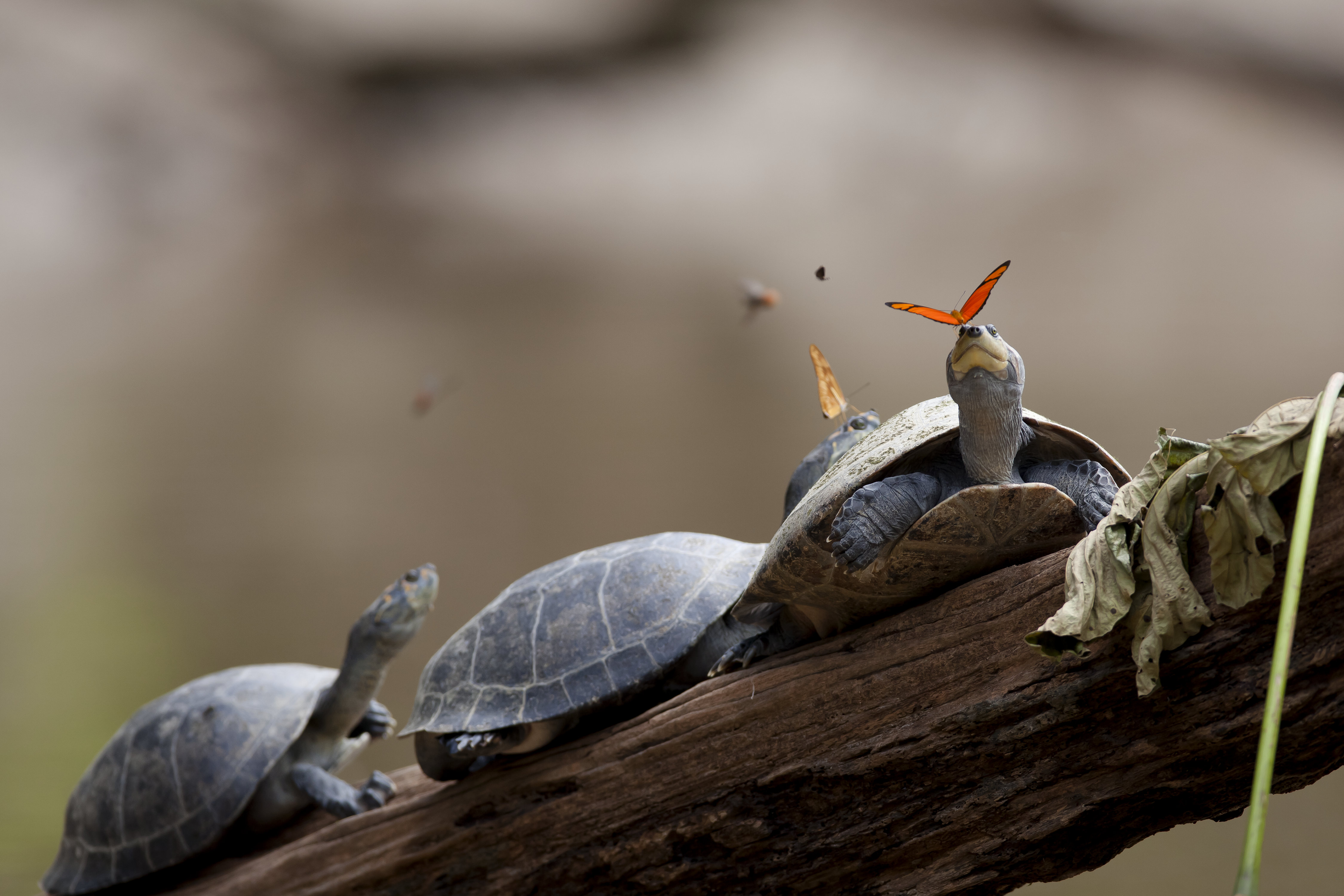
Lachryphagous Lepidoptera, such as the two Julia butterflies (Dryas iulia) drinking the tears of turtles in Ecuador, have hooks and barbs at the tip of the proboscis

== Thorax ==
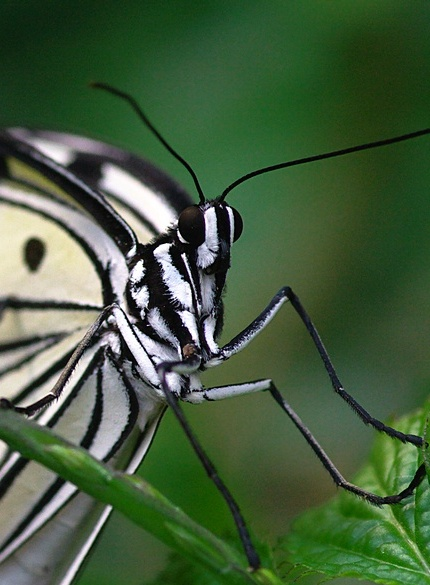
The forelegs are reduced in the Nymphalidae

Diagram of an insect leg

The thorax, which develops from segments 2, 3, and 4 of the larva, consists of three invisibly divided segments, namely prothorax, metathorax, and mesothorax. The organs of insect locomotion – the legs and wings – are borne on the thorax. The forelegs spring from the prothorax, the forewings and middle pair of legs are borne on the mesothorax, and the hindwings and hindlegs arise from the metathorax. In some cases, the wings are vestigial.

The upper and lower parts of the thorax (terga and sterna respectively) are composed of segmental and intrasegmental sclerites which display secondary sclerotisation and considerable modification in the Lepidoptera. The prothorax is the simplest and smallest of the three segments while the mesothorax is the most developed.

Between the head and thorax is the membranous neck or cervix. It comprises a pair of lateral cervical sclerites and is composed of both cephalic and thoracic elements. Between the head and the thorax is a tufted scale called the pronotum. On either side is a shield-like scale called a scapula. In the Noctuoidea, the metathorax is modified with a pair of tympanal organs.

=== Leg ===
Forelegs in the Papilionoidea exhibit reduction of various forms: the butterfly family Nymphalidae, or brush-footed butterflies as they are commonly known, have only the rear two pairs of legs fully functional with the forward pair strongly reduced and not capable of walking or perching. In the Lycaenidae, the tarsus is unsegmented, as the tarsomeres are fused, and, tarsal claws are absent. The aroliar pad (a pad projecting between the tarsal claws of some insects) and pulvilli (singular: pulvillus, a pad or lobe beneath each tarsal claw) are reduced or absent in the Papilionidae. The tarsal claws are also absent in the Riodinidae.

In Lepidoptera, the three pairs of legs are covered with scales. Lepidoptera also have olfactory organs on their feet which aid in "tasting" or "smelling" food plants.

=== Wings ===
Adult Lepidoptera have two pairs of membranous wings covered, usually completely, by minute scales. A wing consists of an upper and lower membrane which are connected by minute fibres and strengthened by a system of thickened hollow ribs, popularly but incorrectly referred to as "veins", as they may also contain tracheae, nerve fibres, and blood vessels. The membranes are covered with minute scales which have jagged ends or hairs and are attached by hooks. The wings are moved by the rapid muscular contraction and expansion of the thorax.

The wings arise from the meso- and meta-thoracic segments and are similar in size in the basal groups. In more derived groups, the meso-thoracic wings are larger with more powerful musculature at their bases and more rigid vein structures on the costal edge.

Besides providing the primary function of flight, wings also have secondary functions of self-defence, camouflage and thermoregulation. In some Lepidoptera families such as the Psychidae and Lymantriidae, the wings are reduced or even absent (often in the female but not the male).

==== Shape ====
The shape of wings exhibits great variety in Lepidoptera. In the case of the Papilionoidea, the costa may be straight or highly arched. It is sometimes concave on the hindwing. It is occasionally serrate or minutely saw toothed on the forewing. The apex may be rounded, pointed, or falcate (produced and concave below). The termen tends to be straight or concave on the forewing while it is usually more or less convex on the hindwing. The termen is often crenulate or dentate, i.e. produced at each vein and concave in between them. The dorsum is normally straight but may be concave.

The hindwing is frequently caudate, i.e. the veins near the end of the tornus have one or more tails. The tornus itself being often produced and frequently lobed. Along the hindwing termen there are tightly packed scales in a double row. The underside of the scales project and form a regular narrow fringe referred to as cilia.

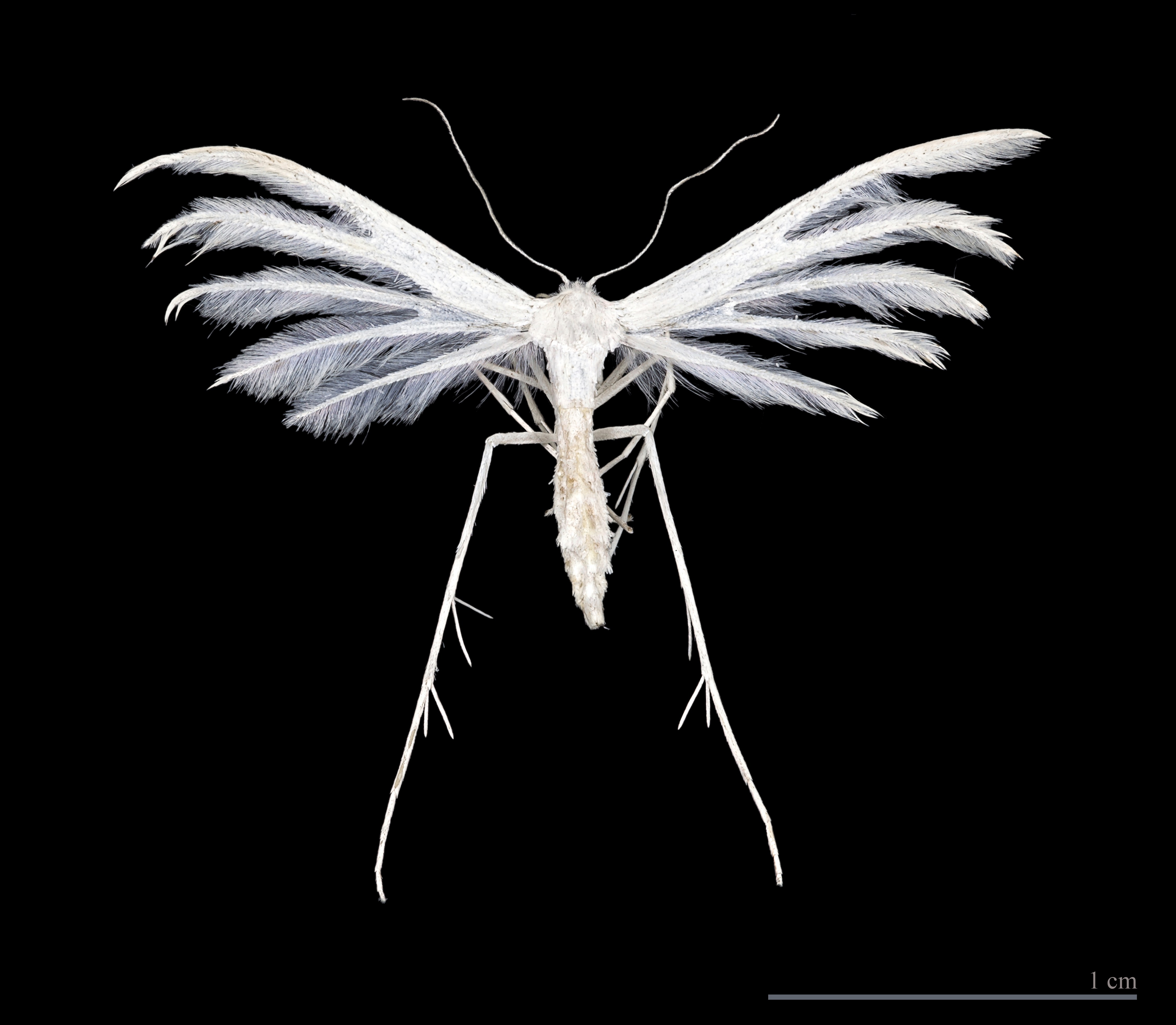
The plume moths (family Pterophoridae) have split wings

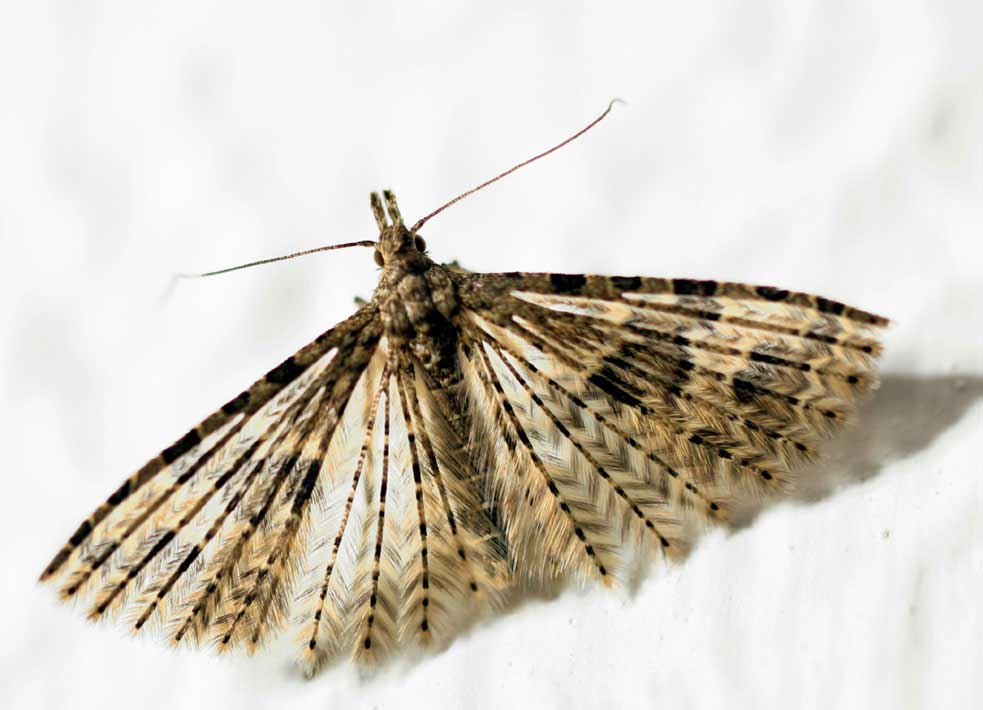
In the many-plumed moths (family Alucitidae), wings are split along each vein

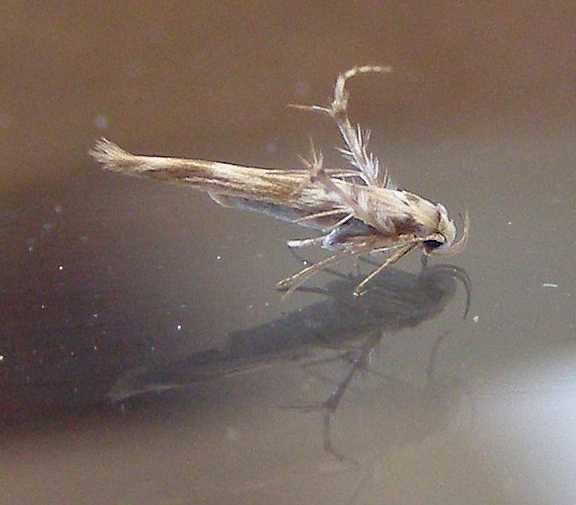
Microlepidoptera of the Gelechioidea, such as Palumbina guerinii, have hair-like fringes along the hindwings

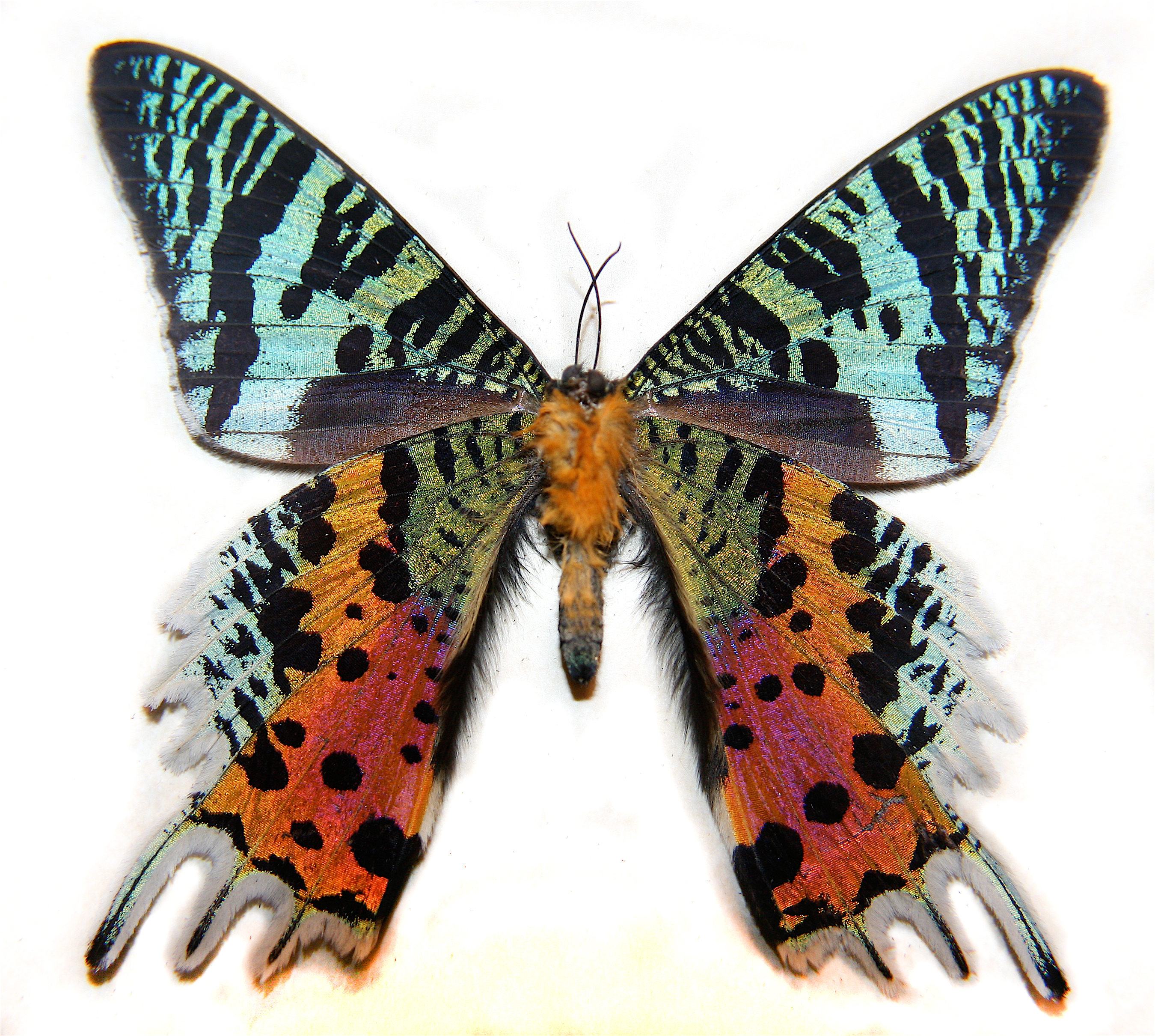
Tailed hindwings of Madagascan sunset moth (Chrysiridia rhipheus family Uraniidae)

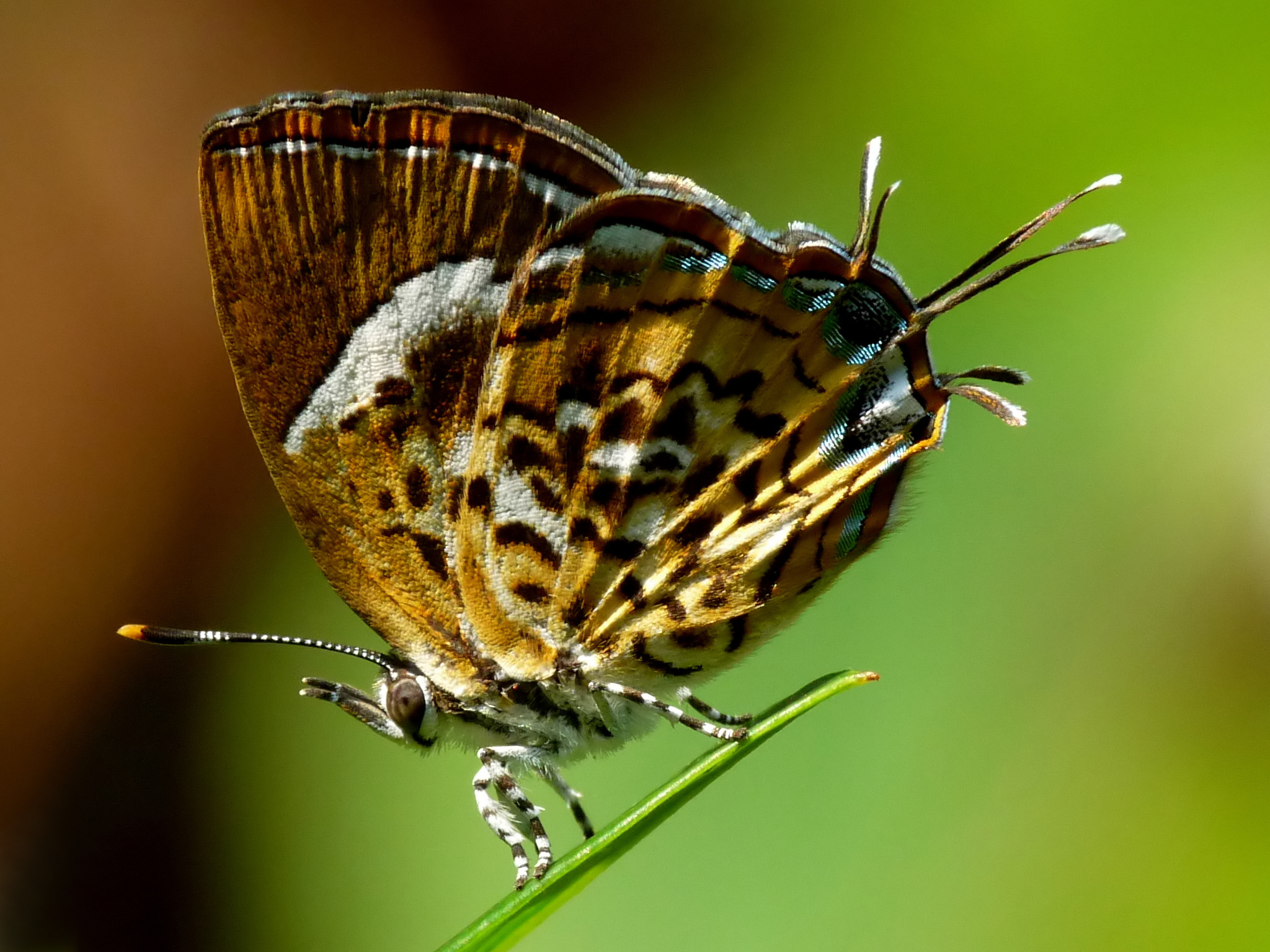
Lycaenids, such as the monkey puzzle (Rathinda amor) have filamentous tails, which are attempted to be explained by the "false-head" hypothesis

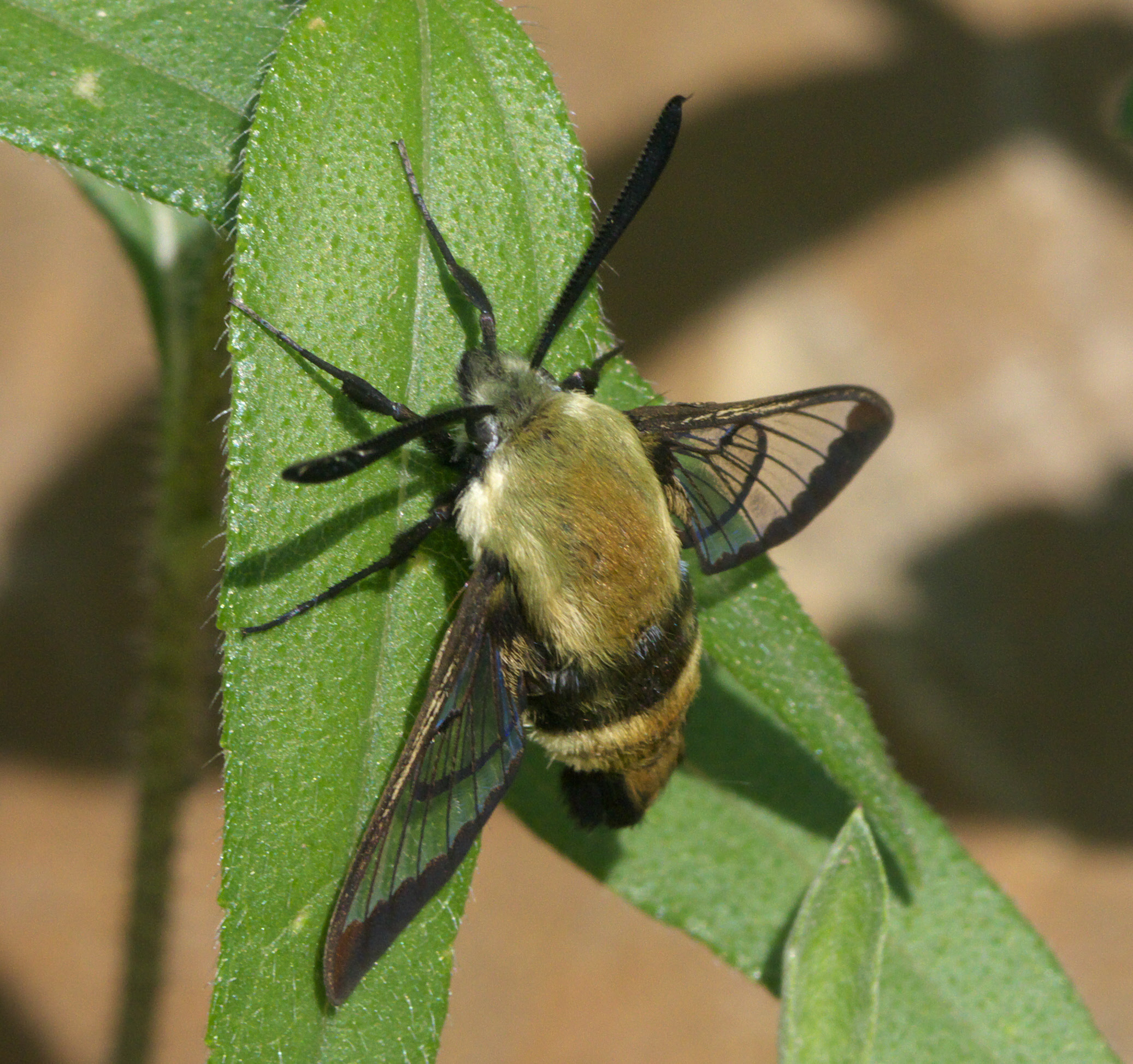
Hyaline patches on the wings of a hummingbird hawk-moth, the snowberry clearwing (Hemaris diffinis)

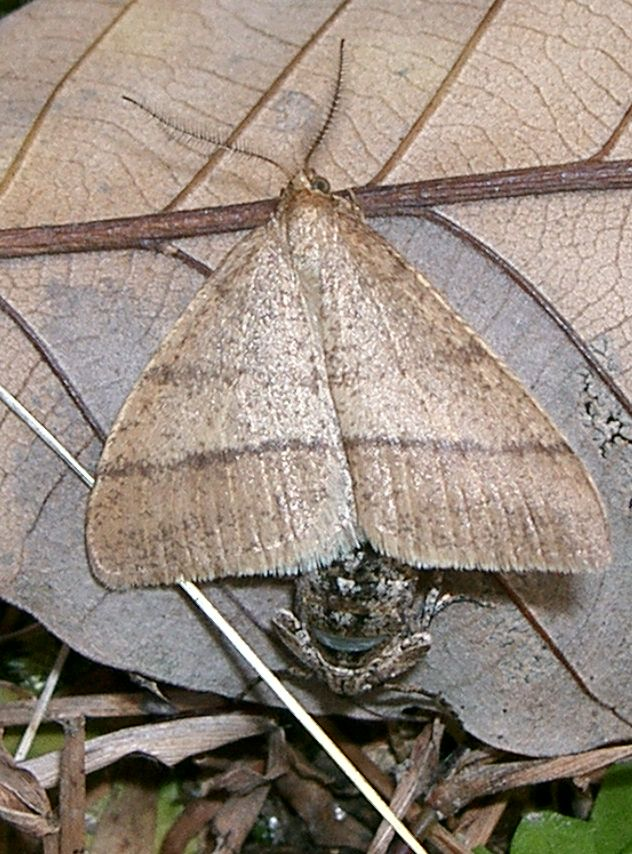
Pachyerannis obliquaria, mating pair – winged male above, small wingless female below

==== Venation ====
Terms associated with the wings. For detailed explanation, refer Glossary of entomology terms.

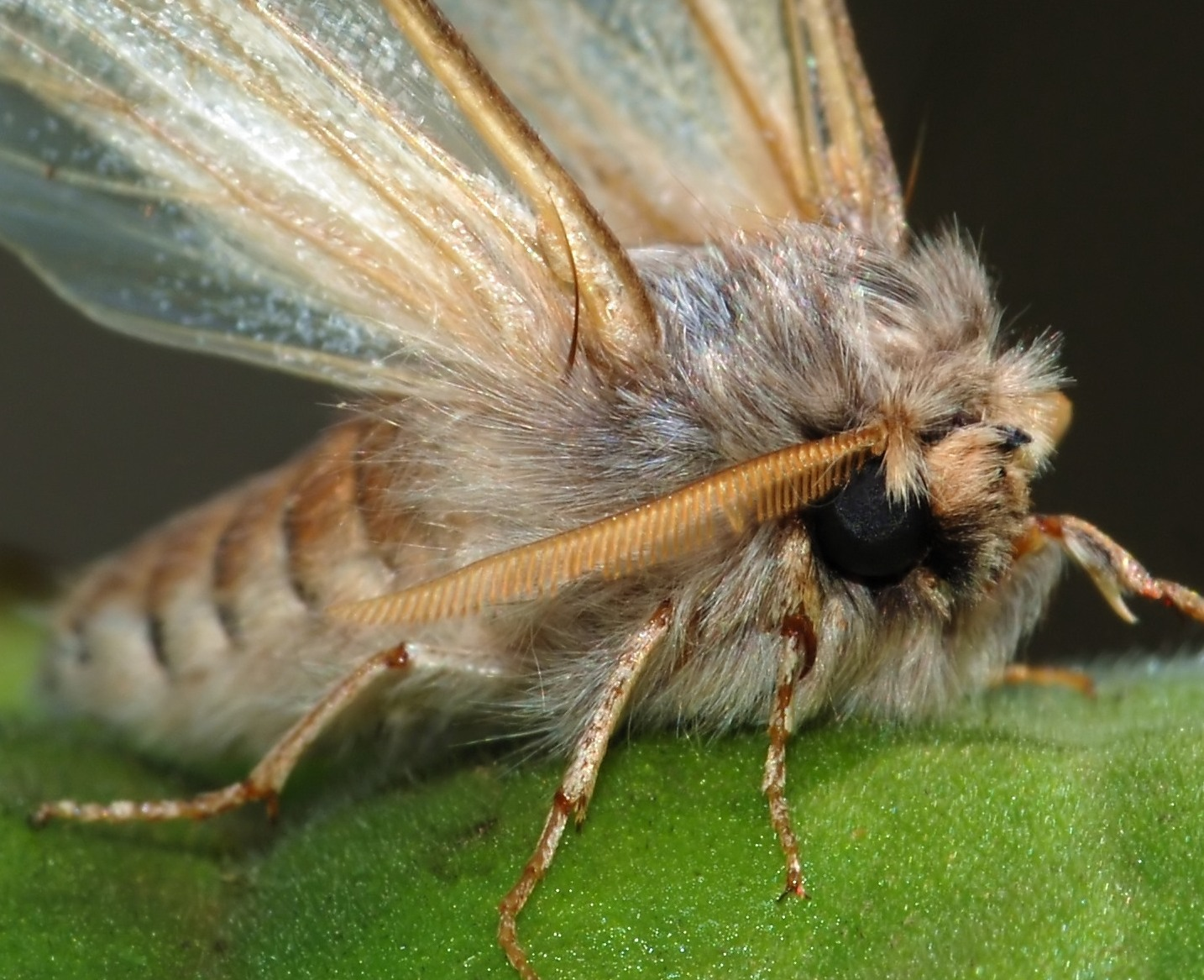
An adult male pine processionary moth (Thaumetopoea pityocampa). Notice the bristle springing from the underside of the hindwing (frenulum) and running forward to be held in a small catch of the forewing, the function of which is to link the wings together.

Tubular veins run through the two-layered membranous wing. Veins are connected to the haemocoel and in theory allow haemolymph to flow through them. In addition, a nerve and trachea may pass through the veins.

Lepidopteran venation is simple in that there are few crossbars. The wing venation in Lepidoptera is a diagnostic for distinguishing between the taxa as also the genera and families. The terminology is based on the Comstock-Needham system which gives the morphological description of insect wing venation. In the basal Lepidoptera, the venation of the forewing is similar to that of the hindwing; a condition referred to as "homoneurous". The Micropterigidae (Zeugloptera) have venation that resembles the most primitive caddisflies (Trichoptera). All other Lepidoptera, the vast majority (around 98%), are "heteroneurous", the venation of the hindwing differing from that from the forewing and being sometimes reduced. Moths of the families Nepticulidae, Opostegidae, Gracillariidae, Tischeriidae, and Bucculatricidae, amongst others, often have greatly reduced venation in both wings. Homoneurous moths tend to have the "jugum" form of wing coupling as opposed to the "frenulum–retinaculum" arrangement in the case of more advanced families.

Insect wing venation, showing the names after the Comstock–Needham system

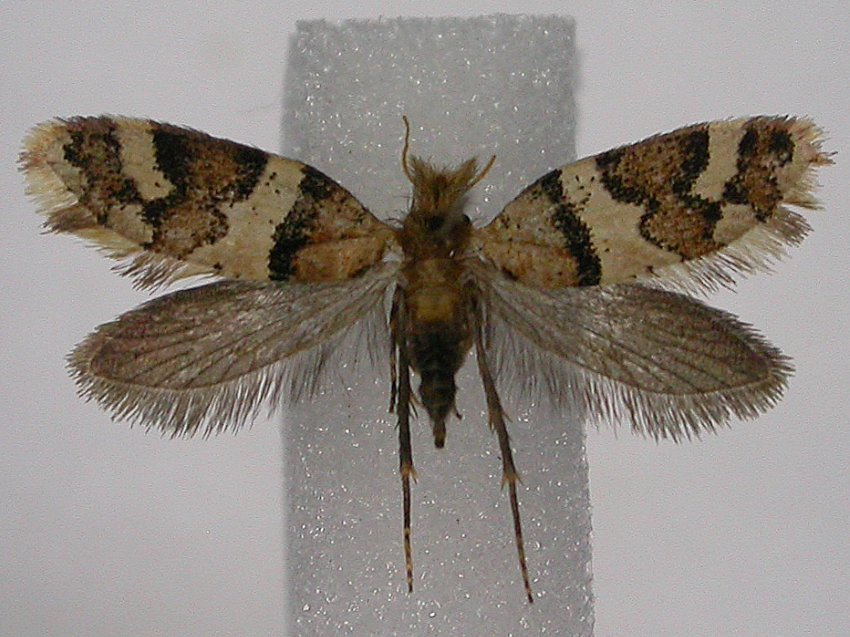
Homoneurous venation in Sabatinca lucilia (Micropterigidae)

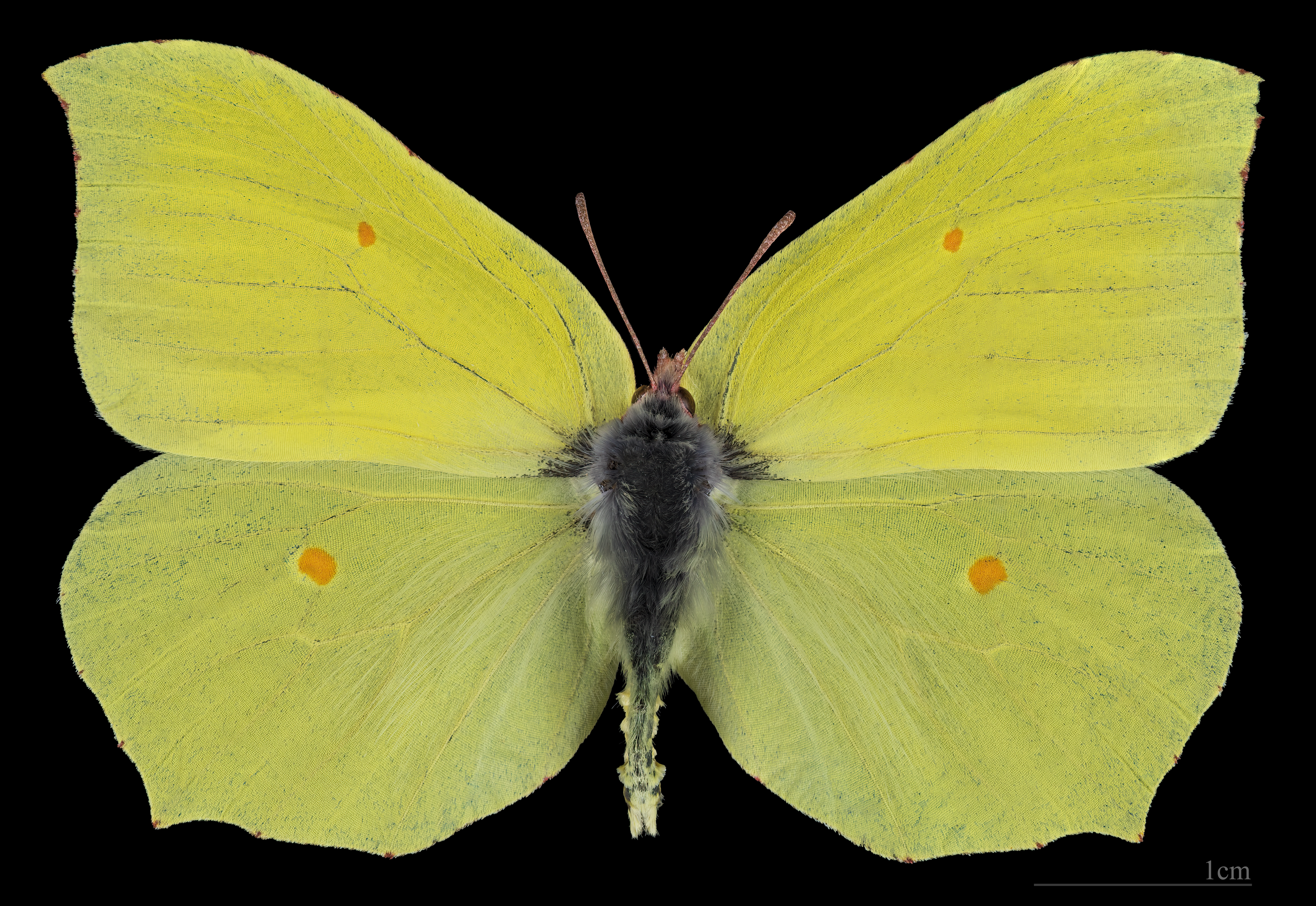
Heteroneurous venation in Gonepteryx rhamni (Pieridae)

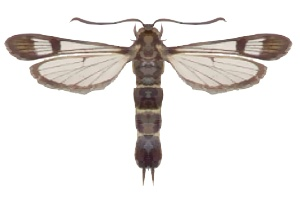
Reduced venation in Synanthedon tipuliformis (Sesiidae)

==== Wing coupling ====
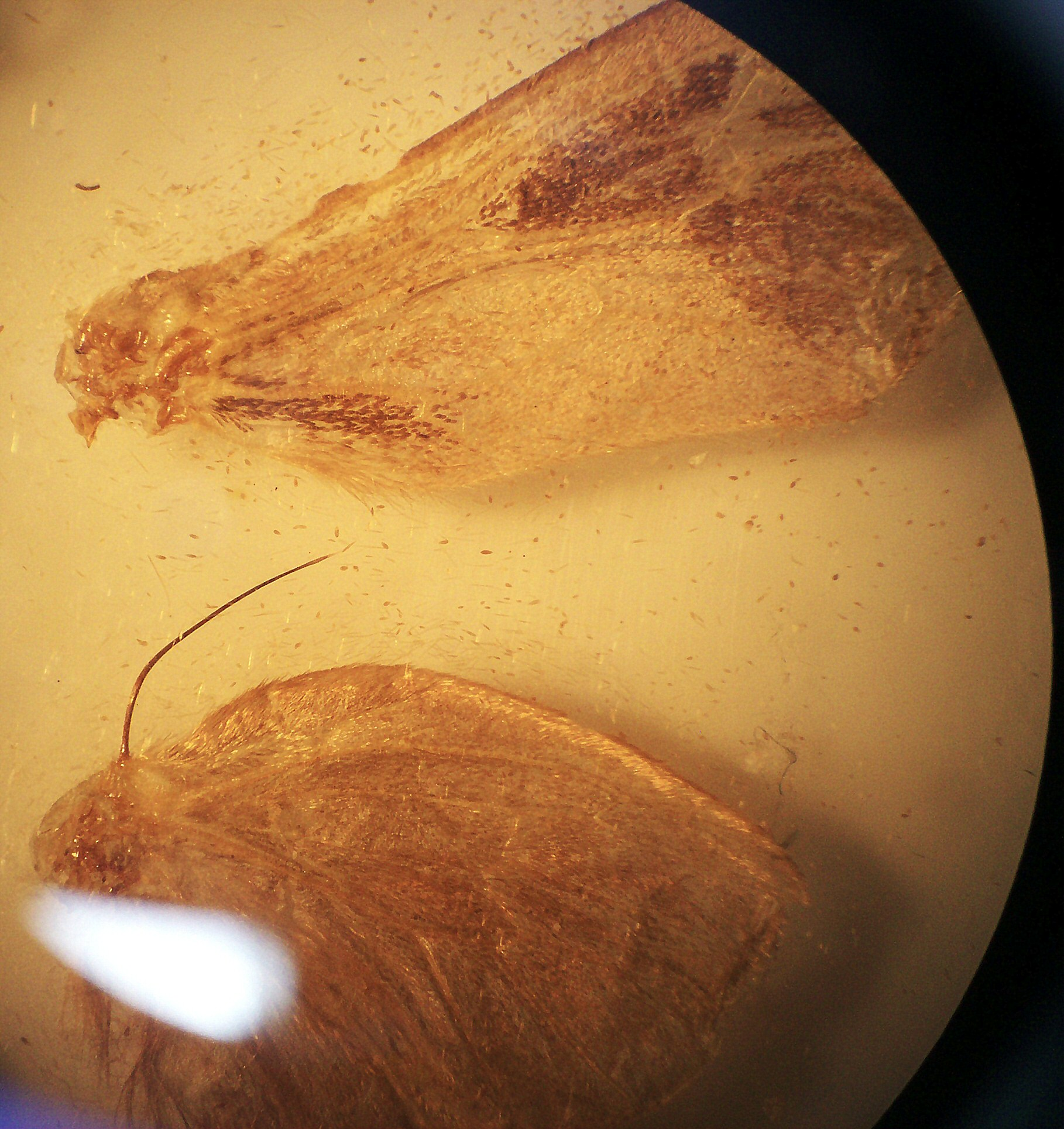
Oiketicus spp. (family Psychidae). The frenulum can be seen at the top of the rear wing, which hooks onto the retinaculum so that the wings travel together during flight. Magnification: 10x

The Lepidoptera have developed a wide variety of morphological wing-coupling mechanisms in the imago which render these taxa "functionally dipterous" (two winged). All but the most basal forms exhibit this wing coupling. There are three different types of mechanisms – jugal, frenulo–retinacular, and amplexiform.

The more primitive groups have an enlarged lobe-like area near the basal posterior margin (i.e. at the base of the forewing) called a jugum, that folds under the hindwing during flight. Other groups have a frenulum on the hindwing that hooks under a retinaculum on the forewing.

In all butterflies (with the exception of male Euschemoninae) and in Bombycoidea moths (with the exception of the Sphingidae), there is no arrangement of frenulum and retinaculum to couple the wings. Instead, an enlarged humeral area of the hindwing is broadly overlapped by the forewing. Despite the absence of a specific mechanical connection, the wings overlap and operate in phase. The power stroke of the forewing pushes down the hindwing in unison. This type of coupling is a variation of frenate type but where the frenulum and retinaculum are completely lost.

== Scales ==
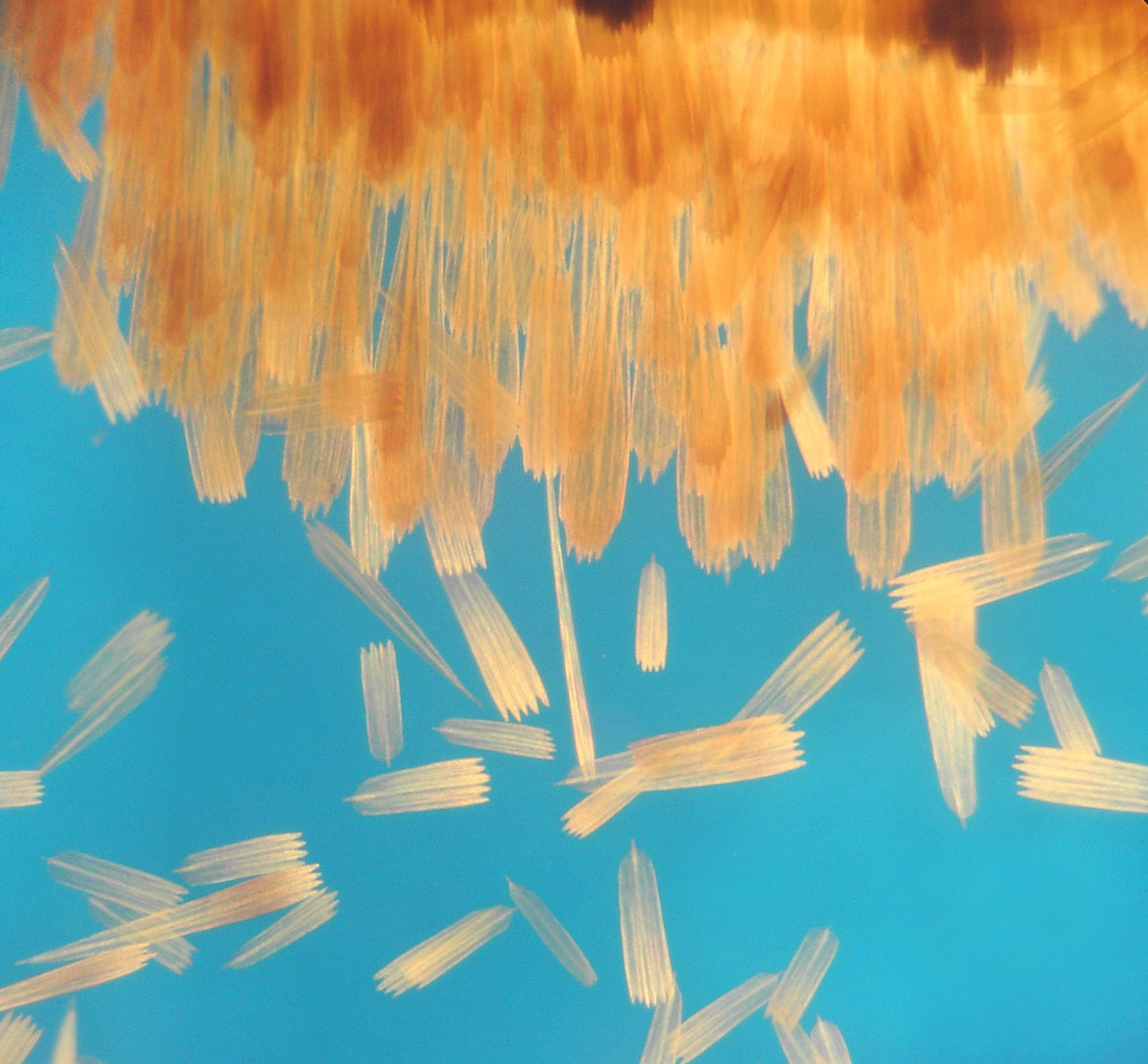
Wing scales form the colour and pattern on wings. The scales shown here are lamellar. The pedicel can be seen attached to a few loose scales.

The wings of Lepidoptera are minutely scaled, which gives the name to this order; the name Lepidoptera was coined in 1735 by Carl Linnaeus for the group of "insects with four scaly wings". It is derived from Ancient Greek lepis (λεπίς) meaning "(fish) scale" (and related to lepein "to peel") and pteron (πτερόν) meaning "wing".

Scales also cover the head, parts of the thorax and abdomen as well as parts of the genitalia. The morphology of scales has been studied by J. C. Downey and A. C. Allyn (1975) and scales have been classified into three groups, namely hair-like, or piliform, blade-like, or lamellar and other variable forms.

Primitive moths (non-Glossata and Eriocranidae) have "solid" scales which are imperforate, i.e., they lack a lumen.

A few taxa of the Trichoptera (caddisflies), which are the sister group to the Lepidoptera, have hair-like scales, but always on the wings and never on the body or other parts of the insect. Caddisflies also possess caudal cerci on the abdomen, a feature absent in the Lepidoptera. According to Scoble (2005), "morphologically, scales are macrotrichia, and thus homologous with the large hairs (and scales) that cover the wings of Trichoptera (caddisflies)".

=== Structure ===
Although there is great diversity in scale form, they all share a similar structure. Scales, like other macrochaetes, arise from special trichogenic (hair-producing) cells and have a socket which is enclosed in a special "tormogen" cell; this arrangement provides a stalk or pedicel by which scales are attached to the substrate. Scales may be piliform (hairlike) or flattened. The body or "blade" of a typical flattened scale consists of an upper and lower lamella with an air space in between. The surface towards the body is smooth and known as the inferior lamella. The upper surface, or superior lamella, has transverse and longitudinal ridges and ribs. The lamellae are held apart by struts called trabaculae and contain pigments which give colour. The scales cling somewhat loosely to the wing and come off easily without harming the butterfly.

=== Colour ===
The scales on butterfly wings are pigmented with melanins that can produce the colours black and brown. The white colour in the butterfly family Pieridae is a derivative of uric acid, an excretory product. Bright blues, greens, reds, and iridescence are usually created not by pigments but through the microstructure of the scales. This structural coloration is the result of coherent scattering of light by the photonic crystal nature of the scales. The specialised scales that provide structural colours to reflected light mostly produce ultraviolet patterns which are discernible in that part of the ultraviolet spectrum that lepidopteran eyes can see. The structural colour seen is often dependent upon the angle of view. For example, in Morpho cypris, the colour from the front is a bright blue but when seen from an angle changes very quickly to black.

The iridescent structural coloration on the wings of many lycaenid and papilionid species, such as Parides sesostris and Teinopalpus imperialis, and lycaenids such as Callophrys rubi, Cyanophrys remus, and Mitoura gryneus, has been studied. They manifest the most complex photonic scale architectures known – regular three-dimensional periodic lattices, that occur within the lumen of some scales. In the case of the Kaiser-i-Hind (Teinopalpus imperialis), the three-dimensional photonic structure has been examined by transmission electron tomography and computer modelling to reveal naturally occurring "chiral tetrahedral repeating units packed in a triclinic lattice", the cause of the iridescence.

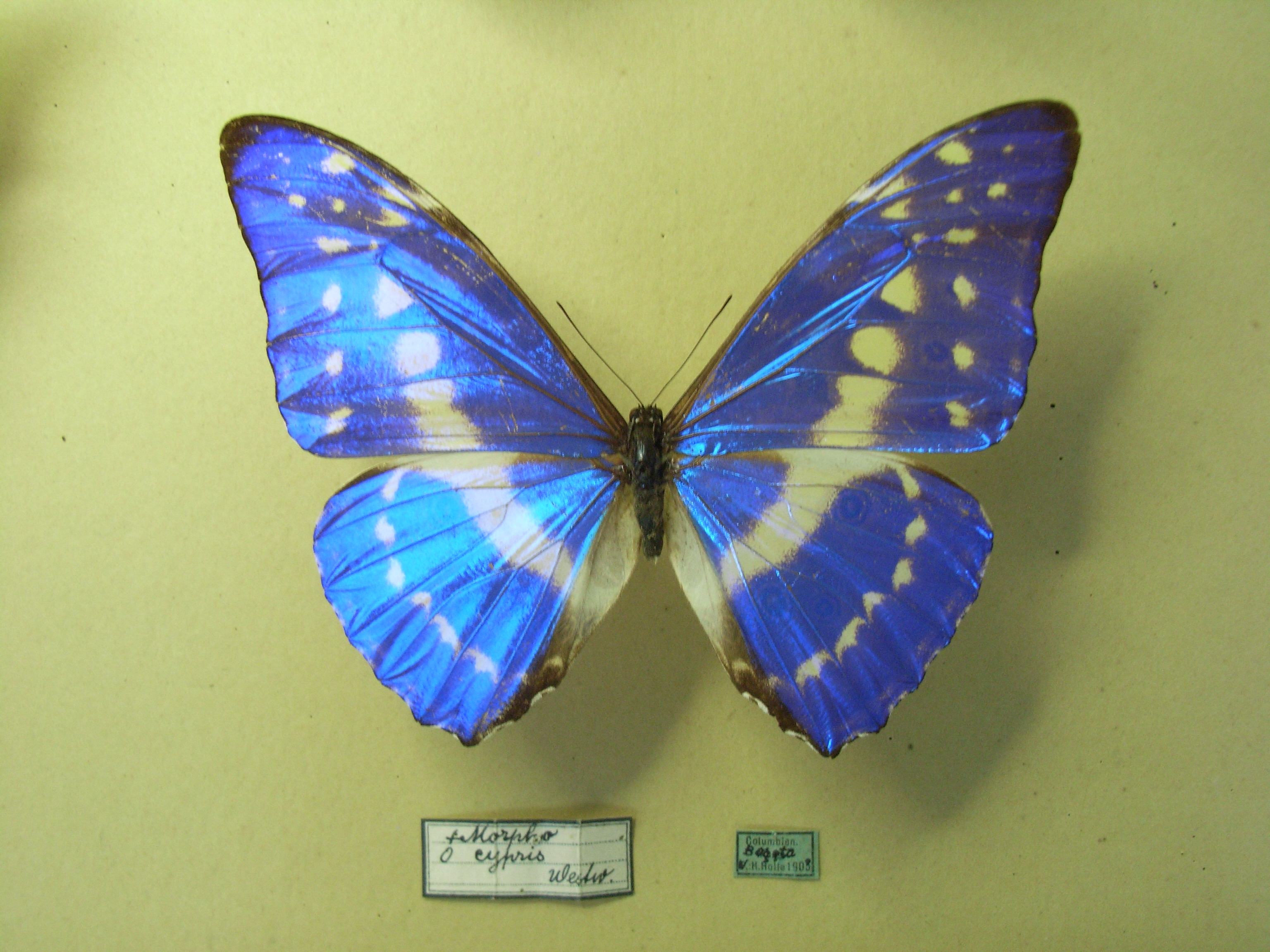
Structural blue colour in morpho cypris, a nymphalid

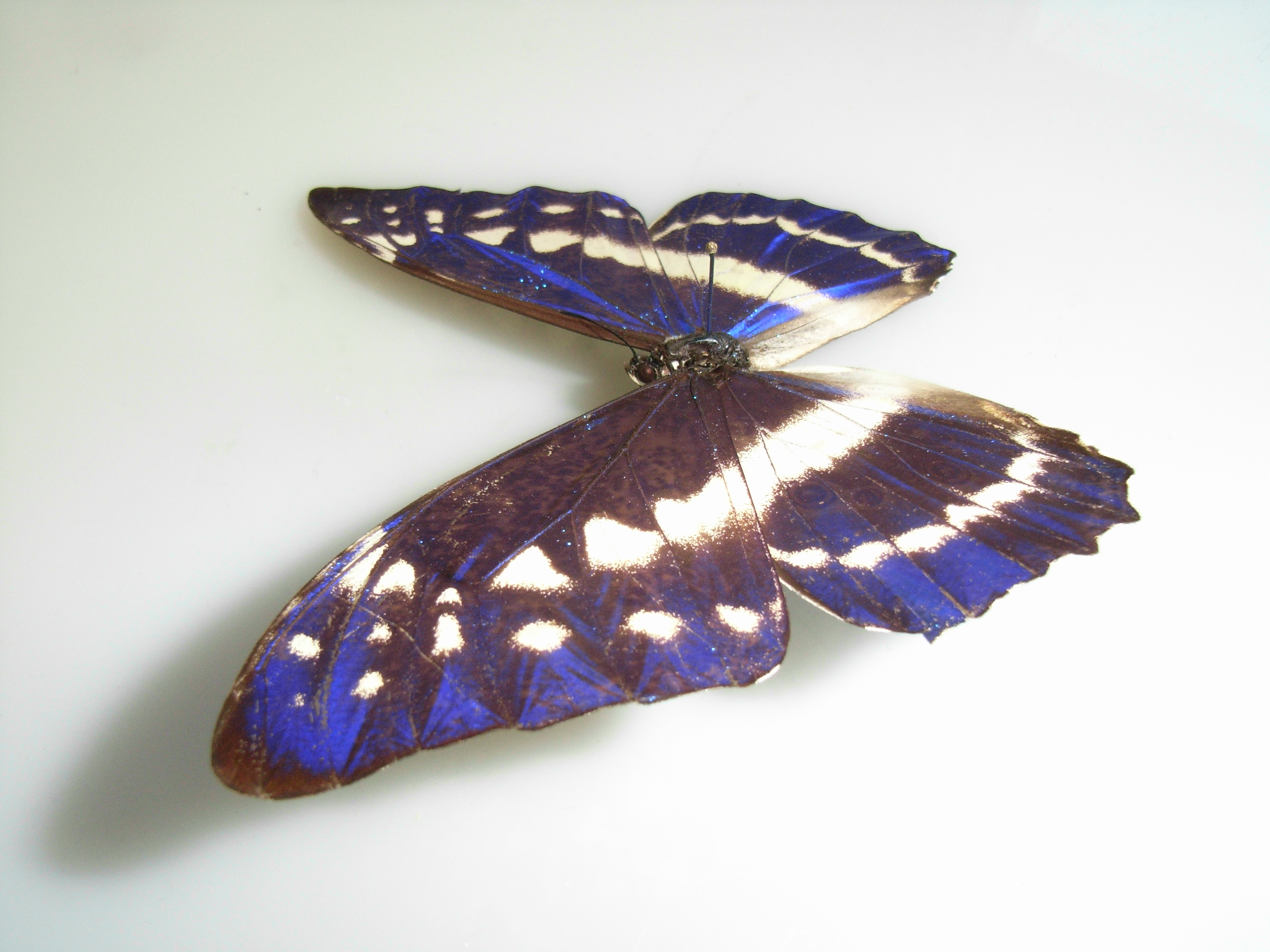
When the same Morpho cypris specimen is seen end on, the blue colour turns black.

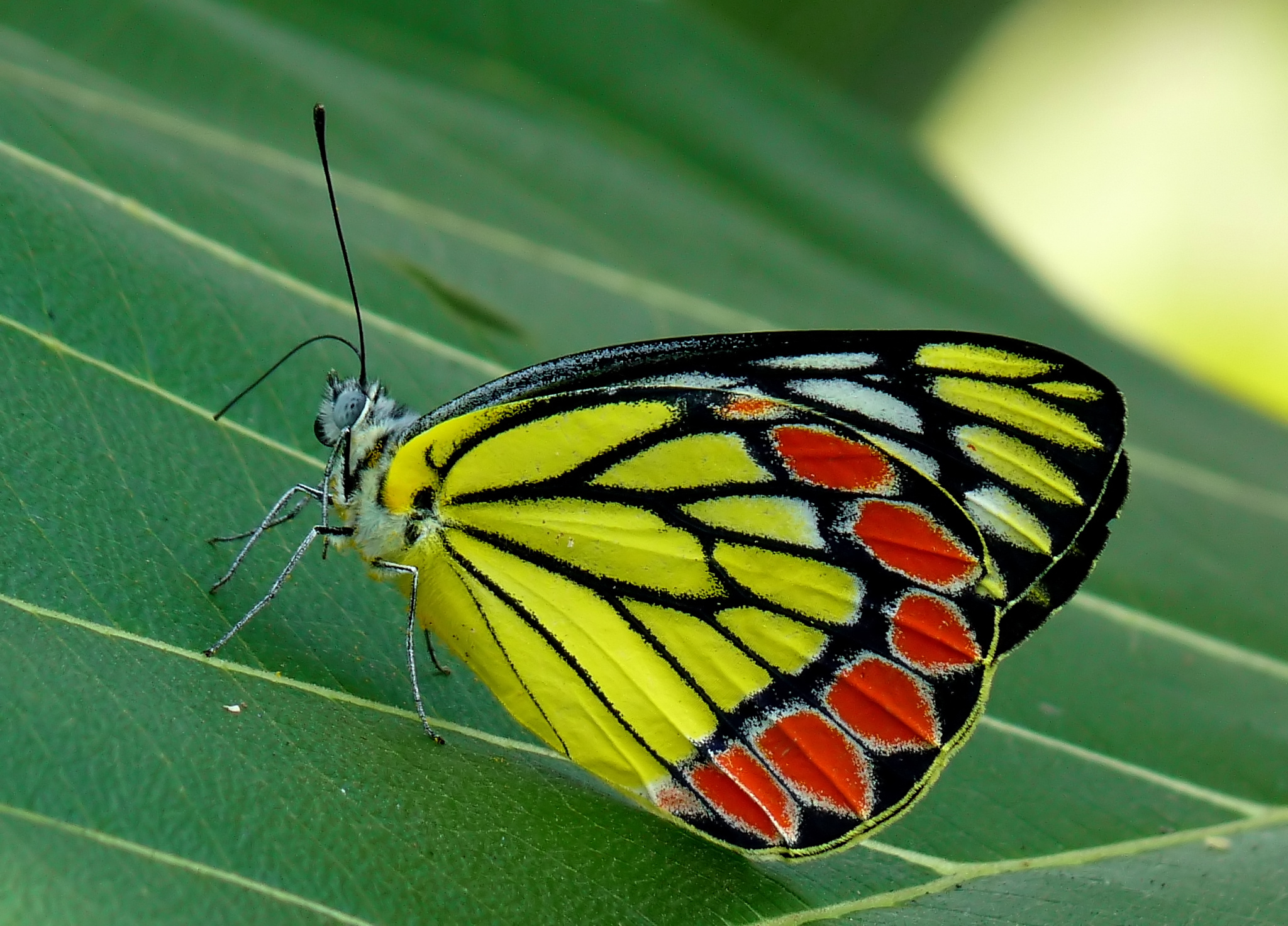
The white colour in pierids, such as Delias eucharis is a derivative of uric acid, an excretory product.

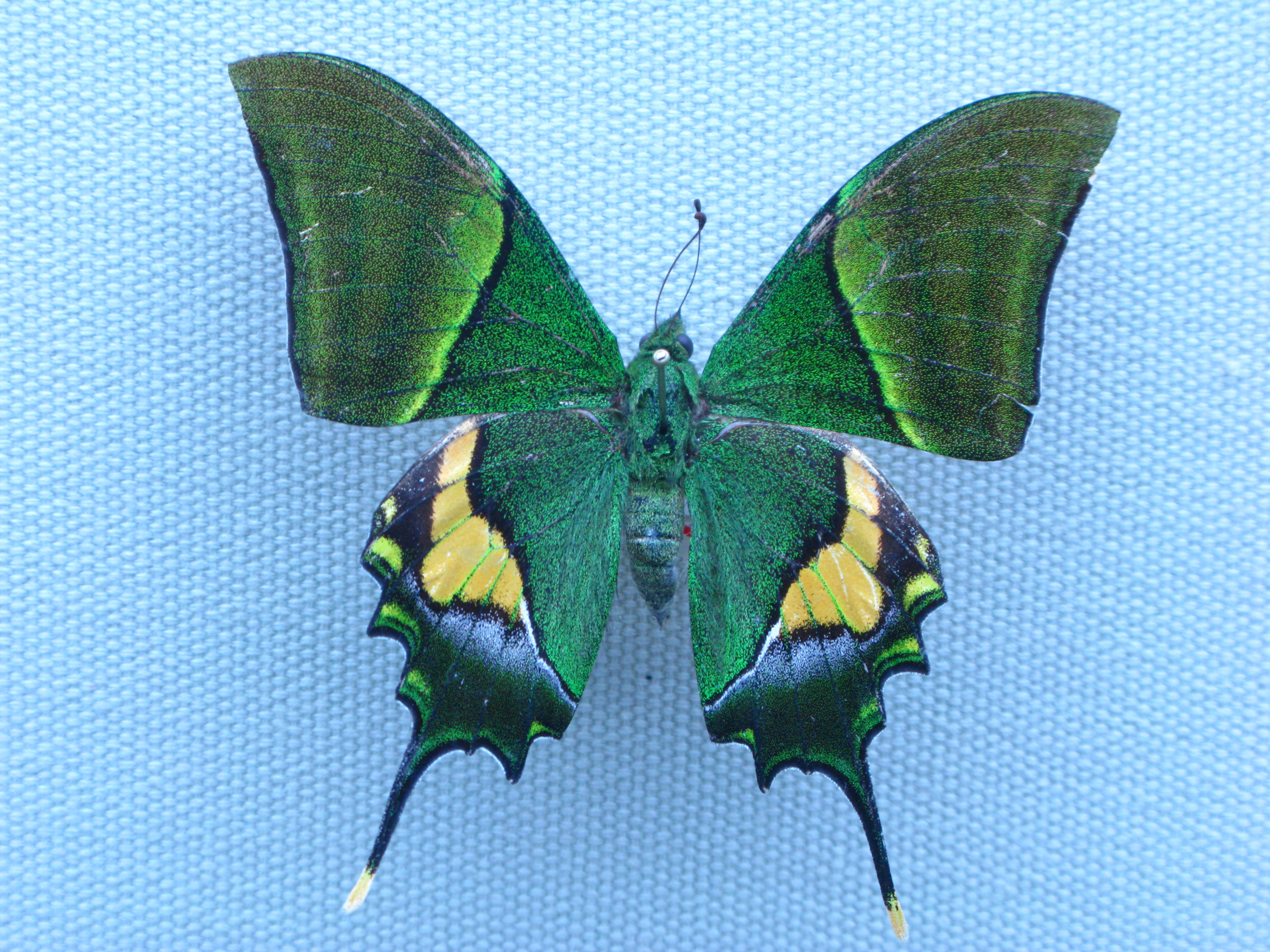
The green iridescence of the swallowtail Kaiser-i-Hind (Teinopalpus imperialis) led to the discovery of three-dimensional photonic crystal structure.

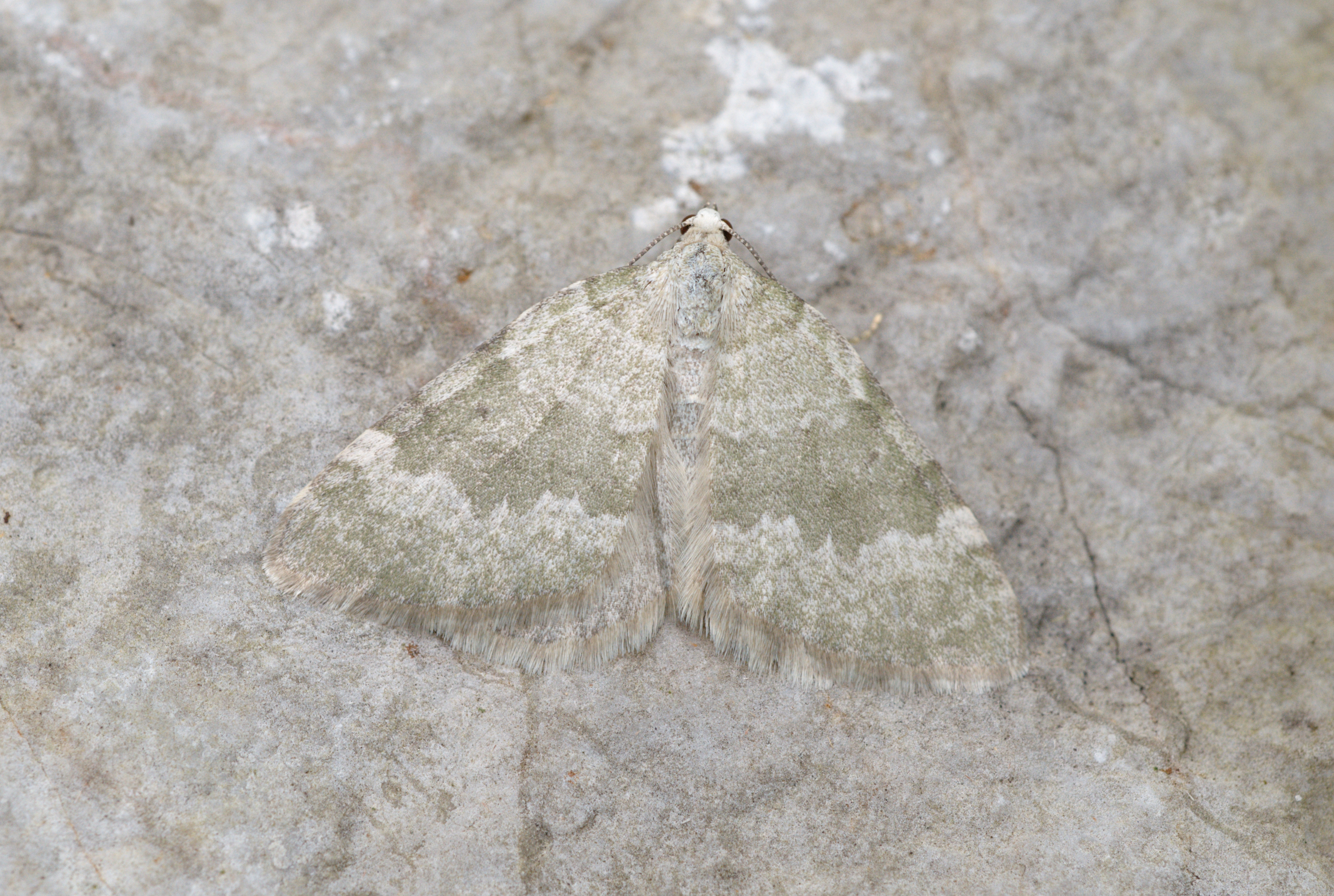
Wing coloration in certain Lepidoptera permits camouflage as can be seen in the case of the geometrid moth Colostygia aqueata.

=== Function ===
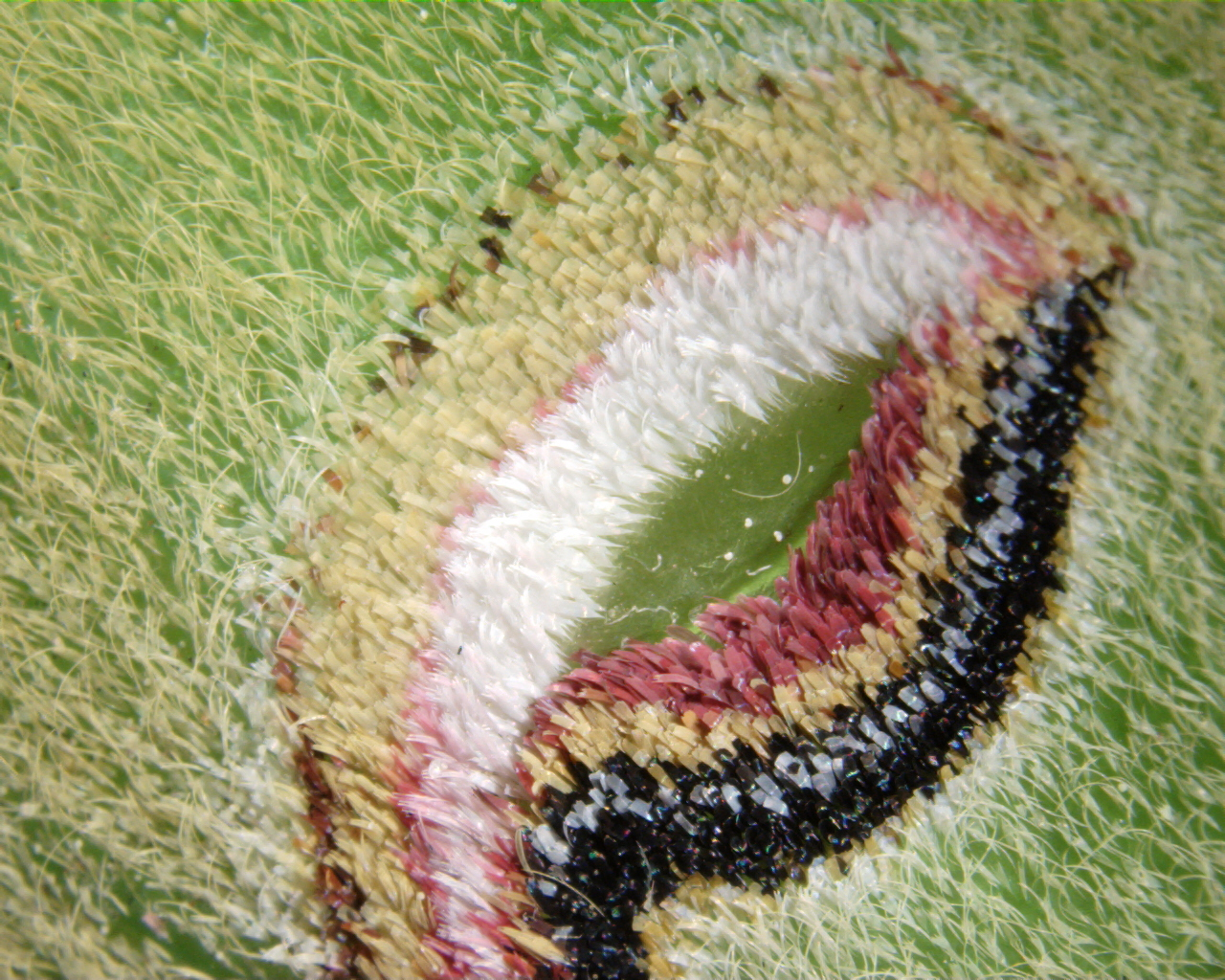
Closeup of male Luna moth eyespot

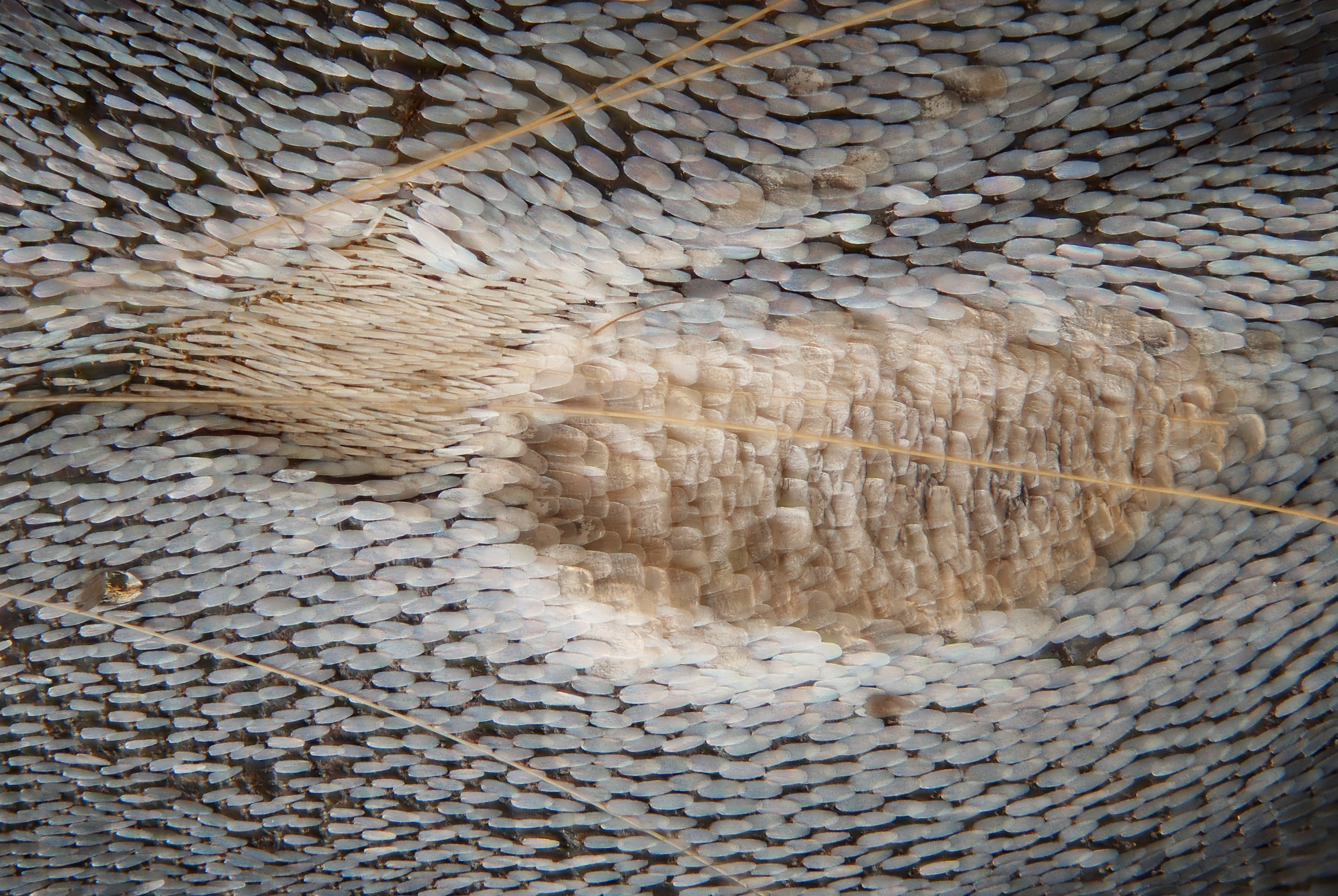
Androconial patch on hindwing of Bicyclus anynana, a nymphalid

Scales play an important part in the natural history of Lepidoptera. Scales enable the development of vivid or indistinct patterns which help the organism protect itself by camouflage, mimicry, and warning. Besides providing insulation, dark patterns on wings allow sunlight to be absorbed and are probably involved in thermoregulation. Bright and distinctive colour patterns in butterflies which are distasteful to predators help communicate their toxicity or inedibility, thus preventing predation. In Batesian mimicry, wing colour patterns help edible lepidopterans mimic inedible models, while in Müllerian mimicry, inedible butterflies resemble each other to reduce the numbers of individuals sampled by inexperienced predators.

Scales may have evolved initially for providing insulation. Scales on the thorax and other parts of the body may contribute to maintaining the high body temperatures required during flight. The "solid" scales of basal moths are however not as efficient as those of their more advanced relatives as the presence of a lumen adds air layers and increases the insulation value. Scales also help increase the lift to drag ratio in flight.

For newly emerged adults of most myrmecophilous Lycaenidae, deciduous waxy scales provide some protection from predators as they emerge from the nest. In the case of the moth butterfly (Liphyra brassolis), the caterpillars are unwelcome guests in nests of tree ants, feeding on ant larvae. The adults emerging from pupae are covered with soft, loose adhesive scales which rub off and stick on the ants as they make their way out of the nest after hatching.

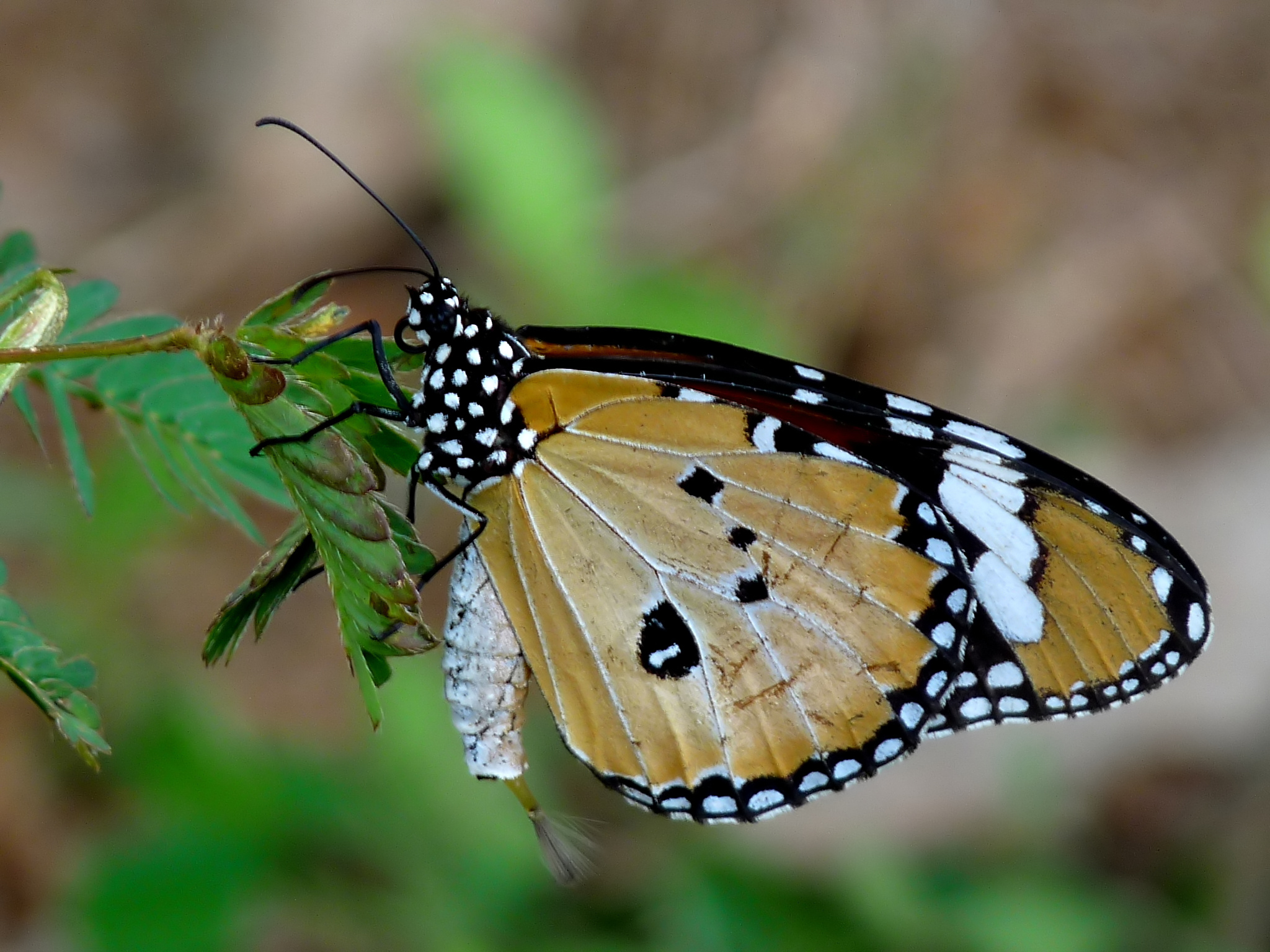
Male Danaus chrysippus showing the pheromone pouch and brush-like organ in Kerala, India

==== Androconia ====
Male Lepidoptera possess special scales, called androconia (singular – androconium), which have evolved as a result of sexual selection for the purposes of disseminating pheromones for attracting suitable mates. Androconia may be dispersed on the wings, body, or legs or occur in patches, referred to as "brands", "sex brands" or "stigmata" on the wings, usually in invaginations of the upper surface of the forewings, sometimes concealed by other scales. Androconia are also known to occur in the folds of wings. These brands sometimes consist of hairlike tufts which facilitate the diffusion of the pheromone. The role of androconia in the courtship of pierid and nymphalid butterflies, such as Pyronia tithonus and Dryas iulia, has been proven experimentally.

Successive close-ups of the scales of a peacock wing

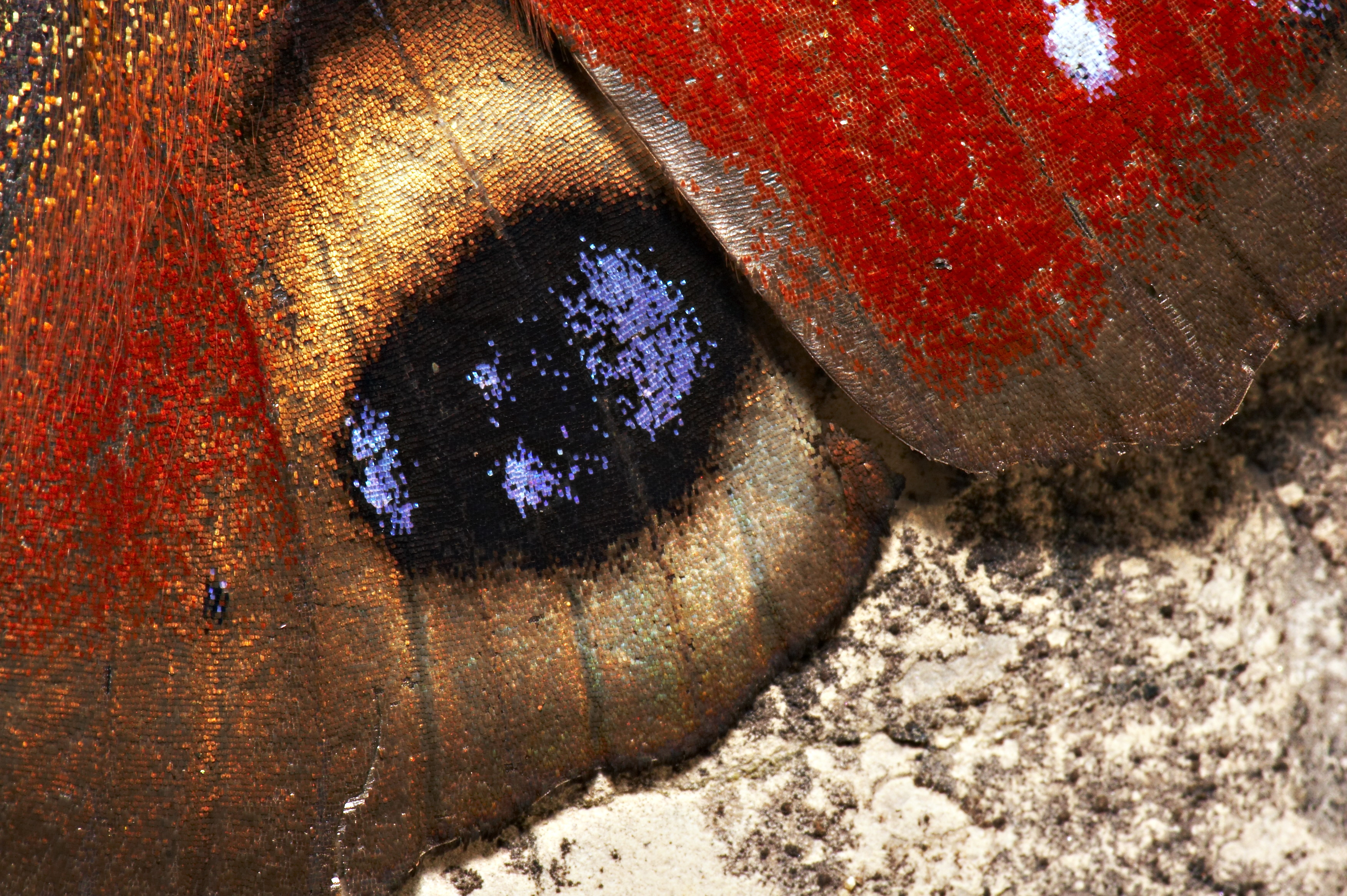
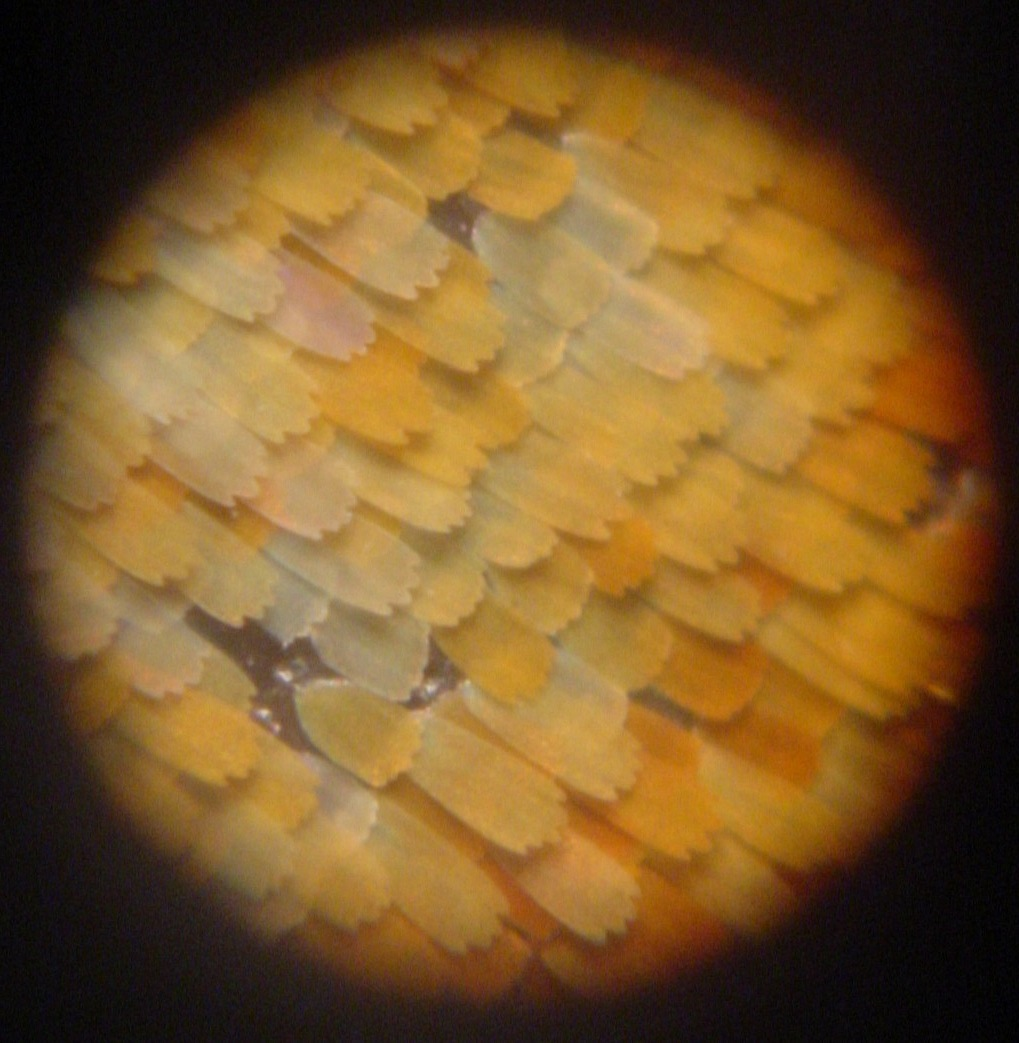
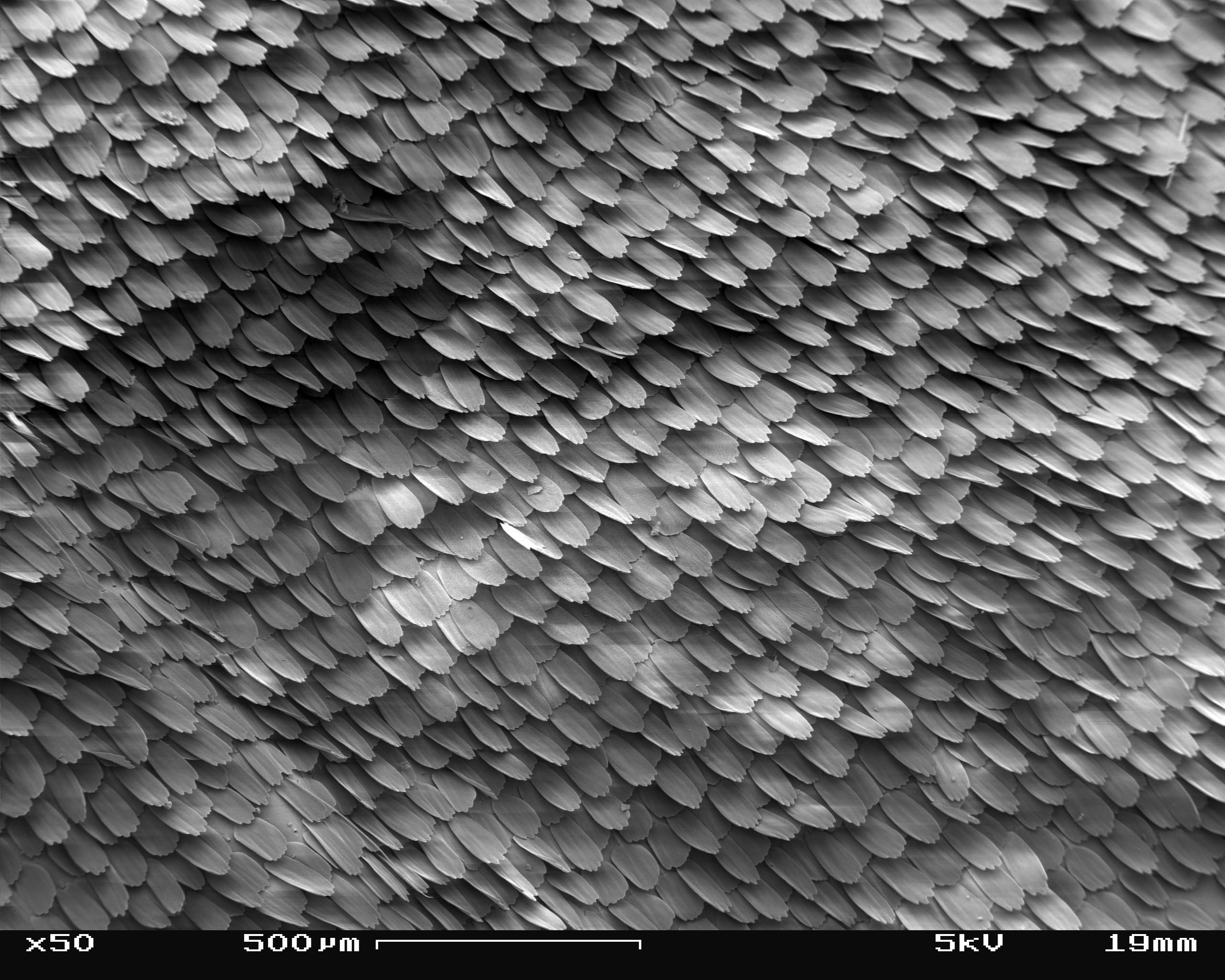
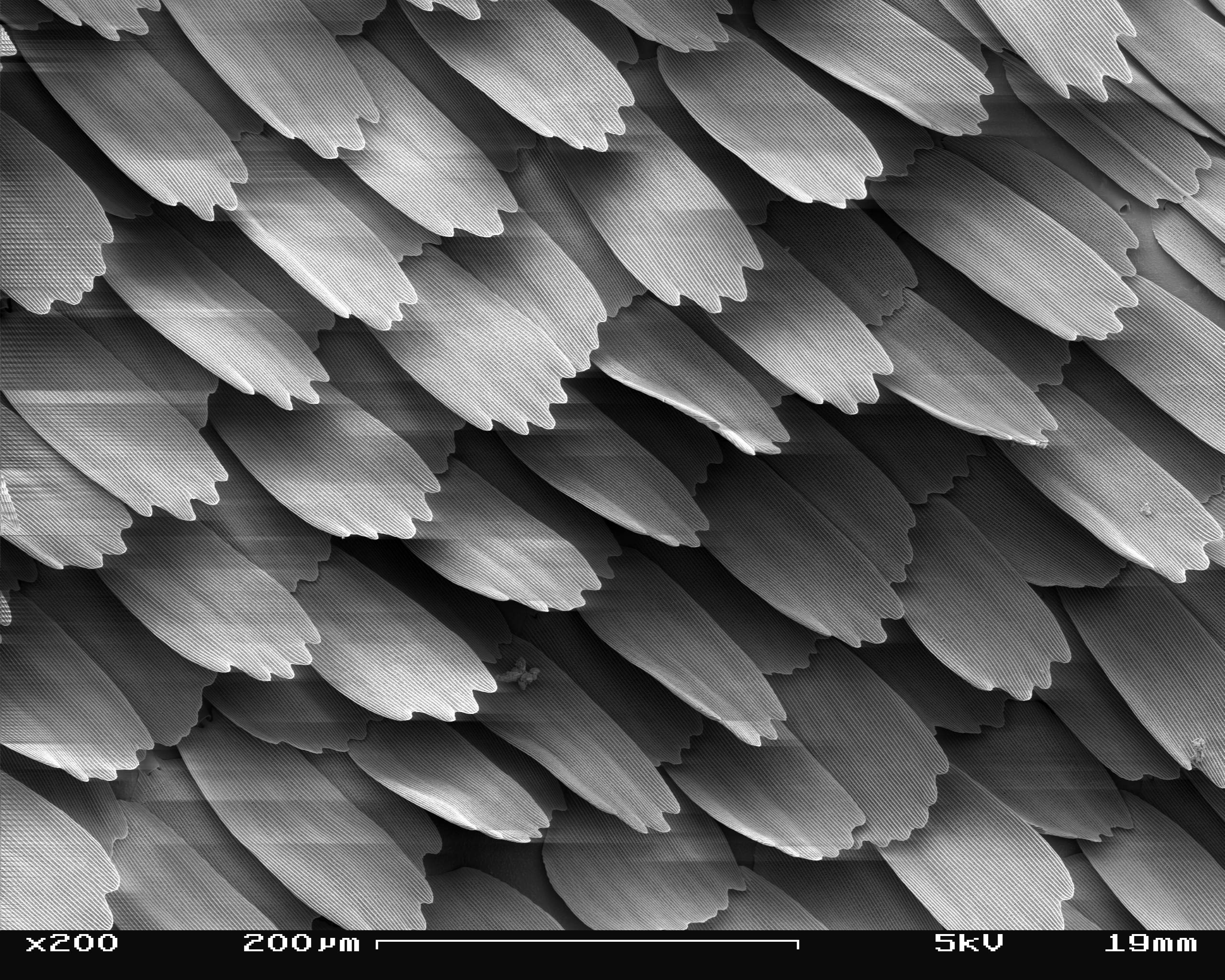
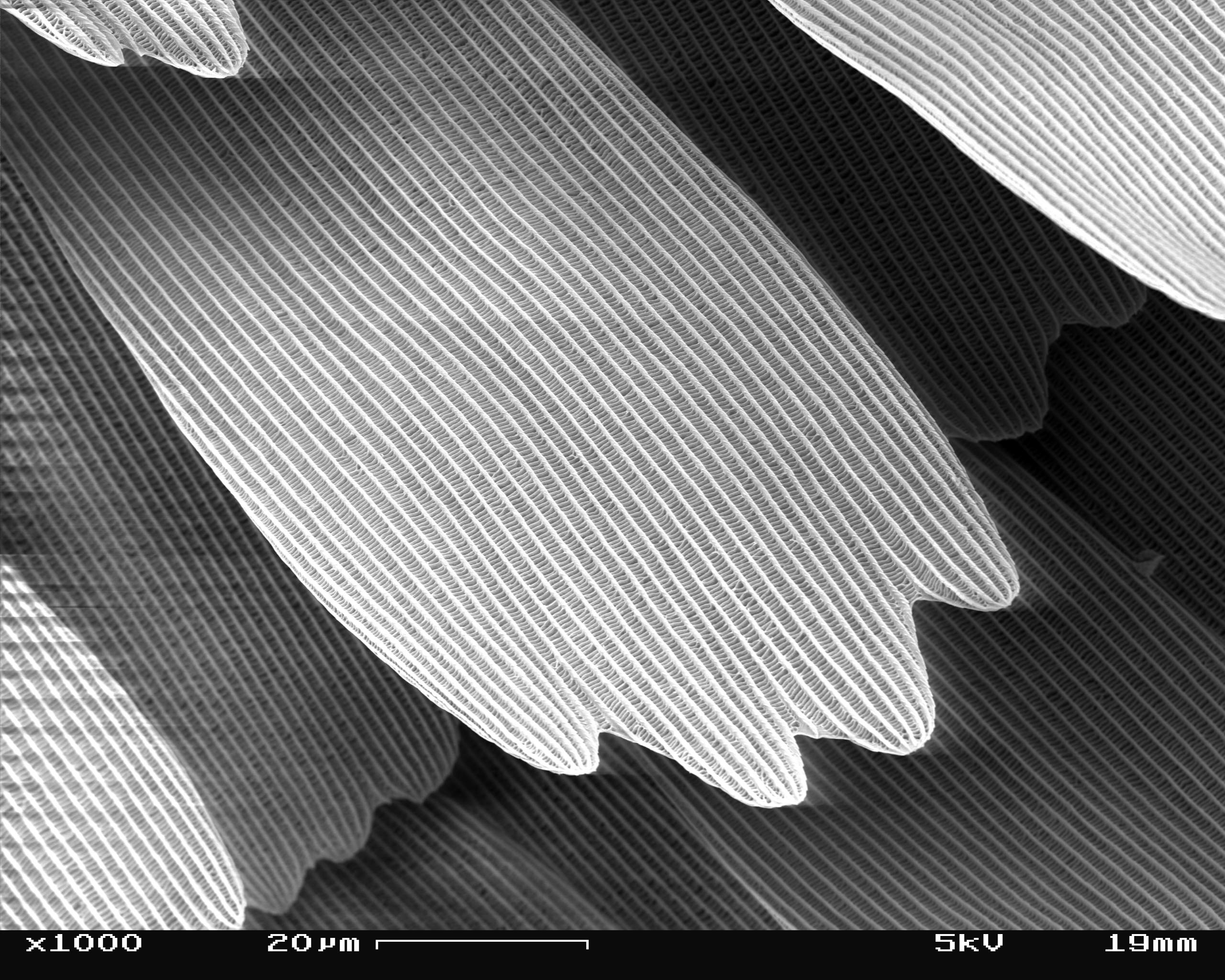
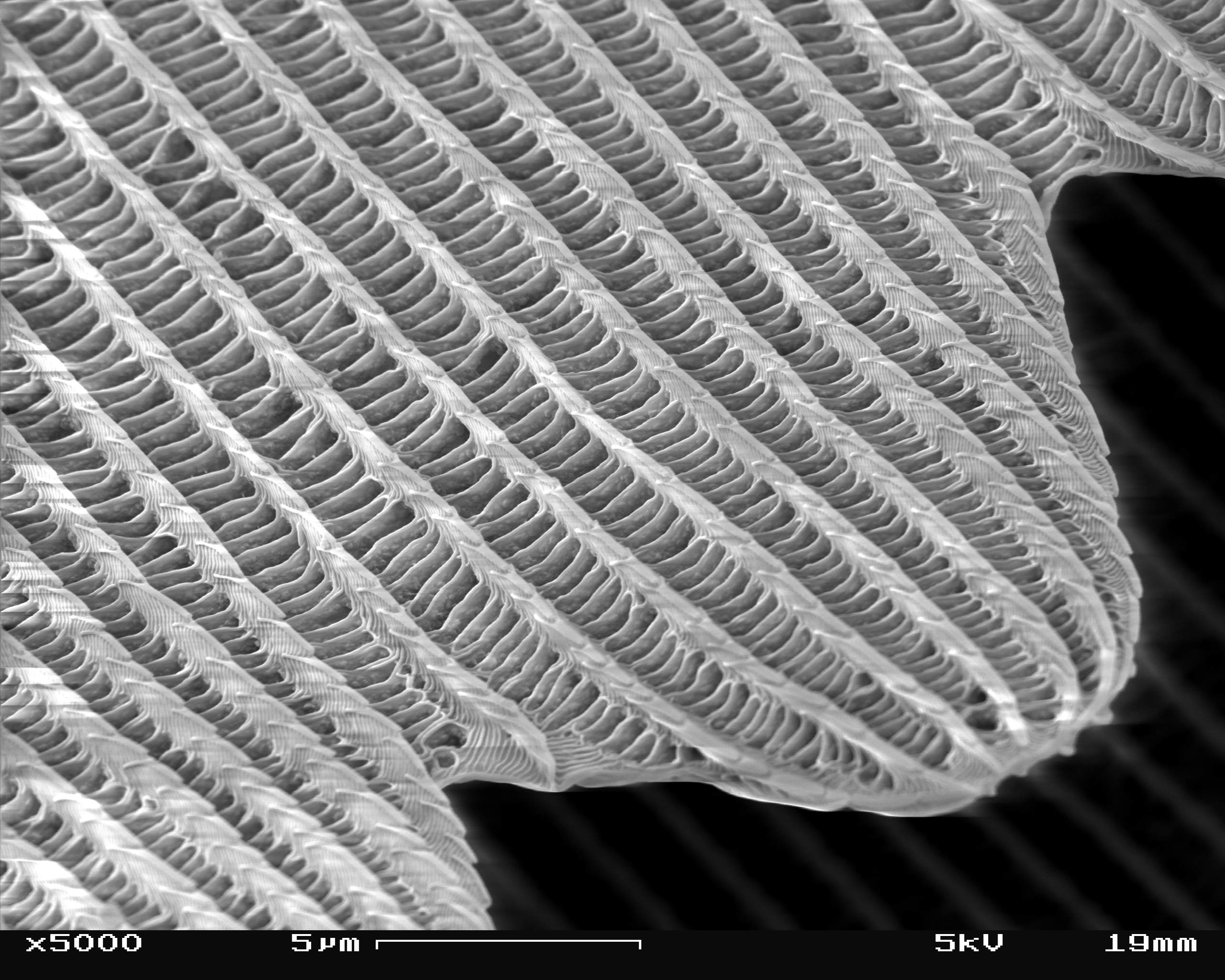
Photographic and light microscopic images
	Zoomed-out view of an Aglais io.	Closeup of the scales of the same specimen.	High magnification of the coloured scales (probably a different species).
Electron microscopic images
	A patch of wing	Scales close up	A single scale	Microstructure of a scale
Magnification	Approx. ×50	Approx. ×200	×1000	×5000

== Abdomen ==
The abdomen or body is composed of nine segments. In the larva it ranges from segments 5 to 13. The eleventh segment of the larva holds a pair of anal claspers, which protrude in some taxa and represent the genitalia.

Many families of moths have special organs to help detect bat echolocation. These organs are known as tympana (singular – typanum). The Pyraloidea and almost all Geometroidea have tympana located on the anterior sternite of the abdomen. The Noctuoidea also have tympana, but in their case, the tympana are located on the underside of the metathorax, the structure and position of which are unique and a taxonomic distinguishing feature of the superfamily.

The females of some moths have a scent-emitting organ located at the tip of the abdomen.

=== Genitalia ===
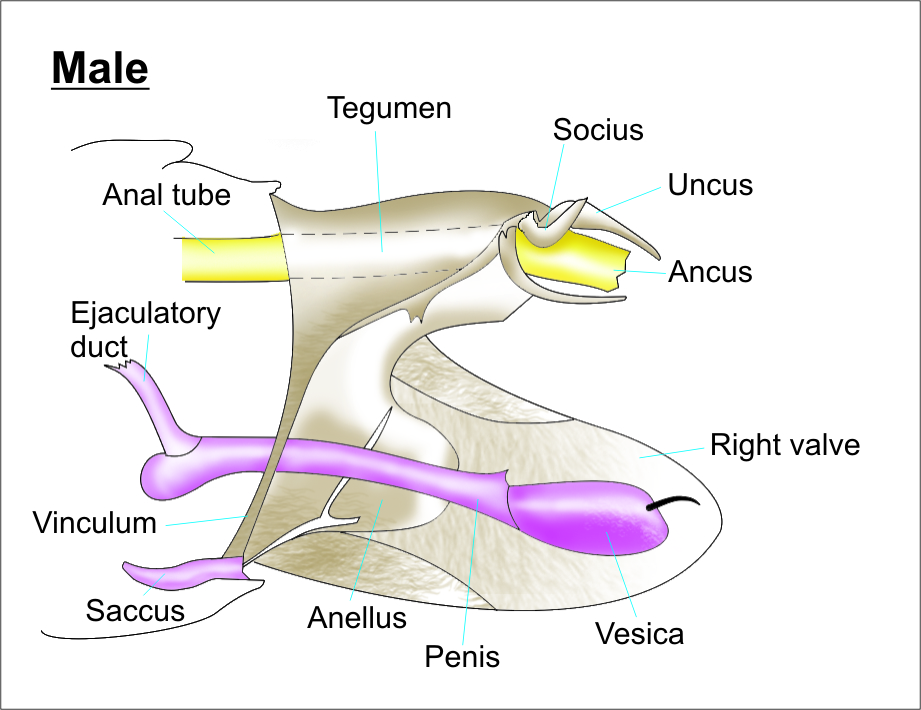
Male genitalia of Lepidoptera

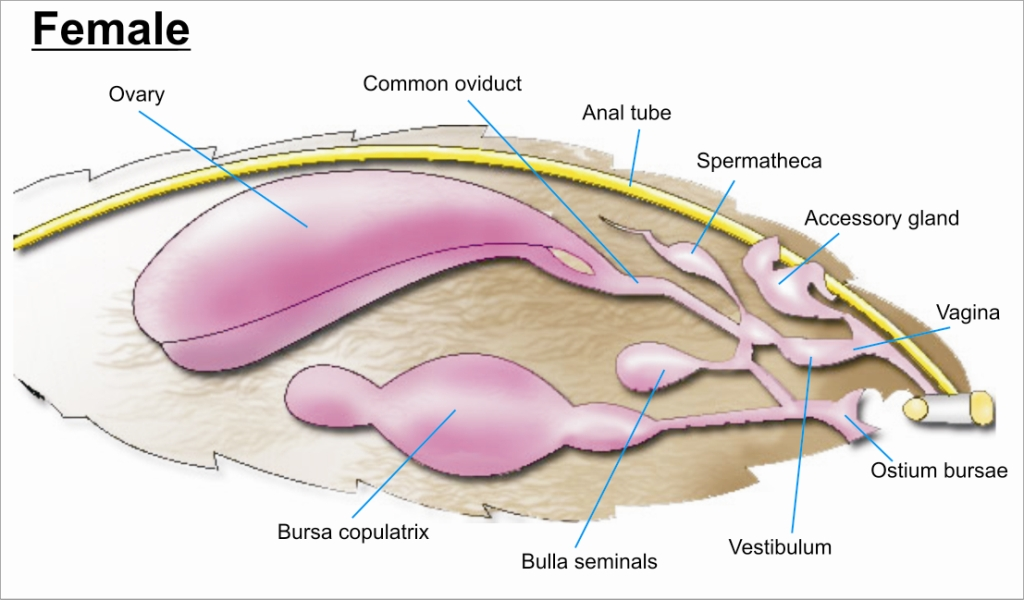
Female genitalia of Lepidoptera

The genitalia are complex and provide the basis for species discrimination in most families and also in family identification. The genitalia arise from the tenth or most distal segment of the abdomen. Lepidoptera have some of the most complex genital structures of all insects, with a wide variety of complex spines, setae, scales and tufts in males, claspers of different shapes and modifications of the ductus bursae in females, through which stored sperm is transferred within the female directly, or indirectly, to the vagina for fertilisation.

The arrangement of genitalia is important in courtship and mating as they prevent cross-specific mating and hybridisation. The uniqueness of a species' genitalia led to the use of the morphological study of genitalia as one of the most important keys in taxonomic identification of taxa below family level. With the advent of DNA analysis, the study of genitalia has now become just one of the techniques used in taxonomy.

There are three basic configurations of genitalia in the majority of the Lepidoptera based on how the arrangement in females of openings for copulation, fertilisation and egg laying has evolved:

- Exoporian: Hepialidae and related families have an external groove that carries sperm from the copulatory opening (gonopore) to the (ovipore) and are termed Exoporian.
- Monotrysian: Primitive groups have a single genital aperture near the end of the abdomen through which both copulation and egg laying occur. This character is used to designate the Monotrysia.
- Ditrysian: The remaining groups have an internal duct that carry sperm and form the Ditrysia, with separate openings for copulation and egg laying.

The genitalia of the male and female in any particular species are adapted to fit each other like a lock (female) and key (male). In males, the ninth abdominal segment is divided into a dorsal "tegumen" and ventral "viniculum". They form a ring-like structure for the attachment of genital parts and a pair of lateral clasping organs (claspers or "harpe"). The male has a median tubular organ (called the aedeagus) which is extended through an eversible sheath (or "vesica") to inseminate the female. The males have paired sperm ducts in all lepidopterans; the paired testes are separate in basal taxa and fused in advanced forms.

While the layout of internal genital ducts and openings of the female genitalia depends upon the taxonomic group that insect belongs to, the internal female reproductive system of all lepidopterans consists of paired ovaries and accessory glands which produce the yolks and shells of the eggs. Female insects have a system of receptacles and ducts in which sperm is received, transported, and stored. The oviducts of the female join to form a common duct (called the "oviductus communis") which leads to the vagina.

When copulation takes place, the male butterfly or moth places a capsule of sperm (spermatophore) in a receptacle of the female (called the corpus bursae). The sperm, when released from the capsule, swims directly into or via a small tube into a special seminal receptacle (spermatheca), where the sperm is stored until it is released into the vagina for fertilisation during egg laying, which may occur hours, days, or months after mating. The eggs pass through the ovipore. The ovipore may be at the end of a modified ovipositor or surrounded by a pair of broad setose anal papillae.

Butterflies of the Parnassinae (family Papilionidae) and some Acraeini (family Nymphalidae) add a post-copulatory plug, called the sphragis, to the abdomen of the female after copulation preventing her from mating again.

The males of many species of Papilionoidea are furnished with secondary sexual characteristics. These consist of scent-producing organs, brushes, and brands or pouches of specialised scales. These presumably meet the function of convincing the female that she is mating with a male of the correct species.

Three species of hawkmoth have been recorded to emit ultrasound clicks by rubbing their genitalia; males produce by rubbing rigid scales on the exterior of the claspers while females produce sound by contracting their genitalia which causes rubbing of scales against the abdomen. The function of this noise making is not clear and suggestions put forward include the jamming of bat echolocation, and, advertising that the bat's prey are prickly and excellent fliers.

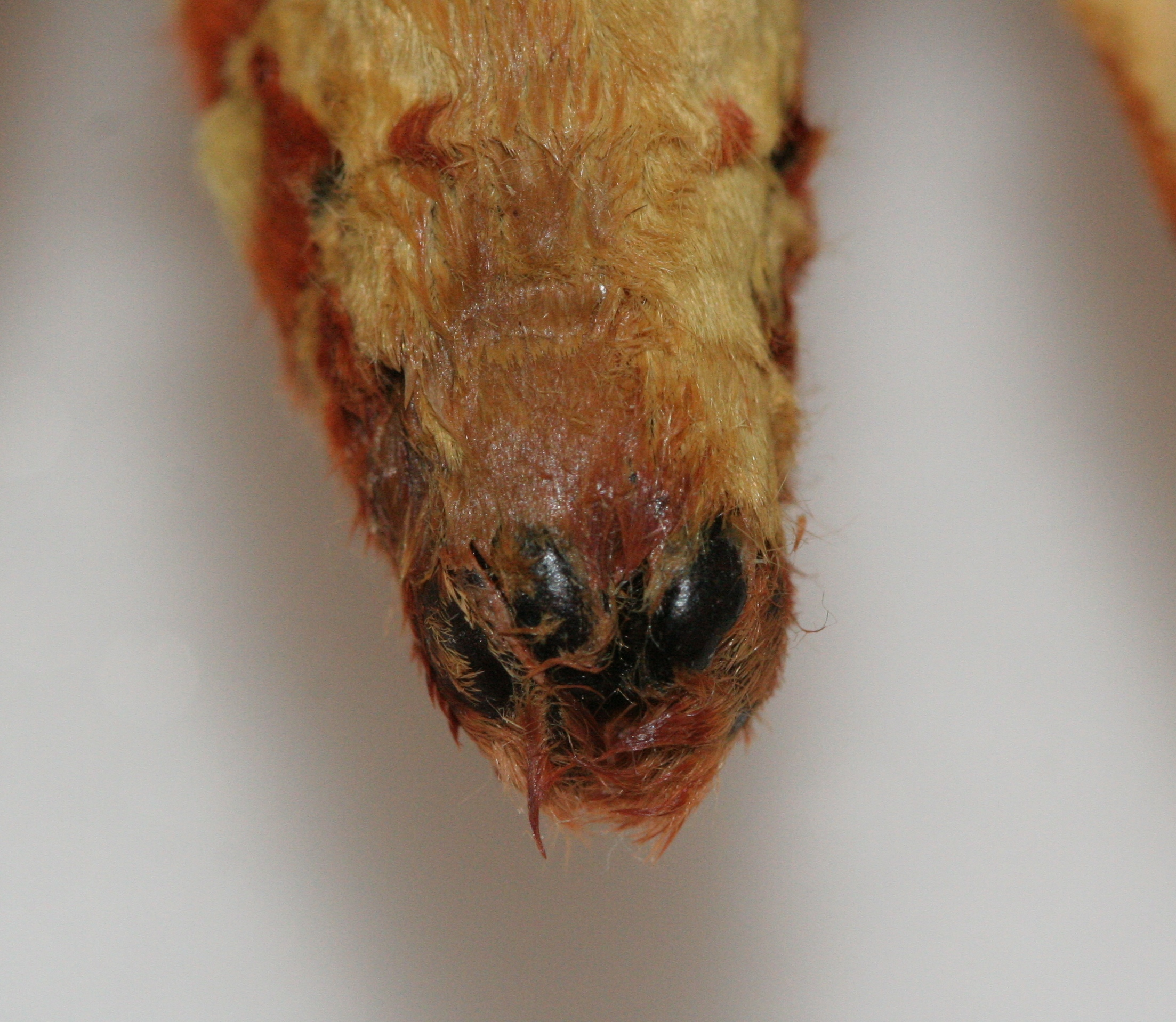
Citheronia regalis with claspers closed

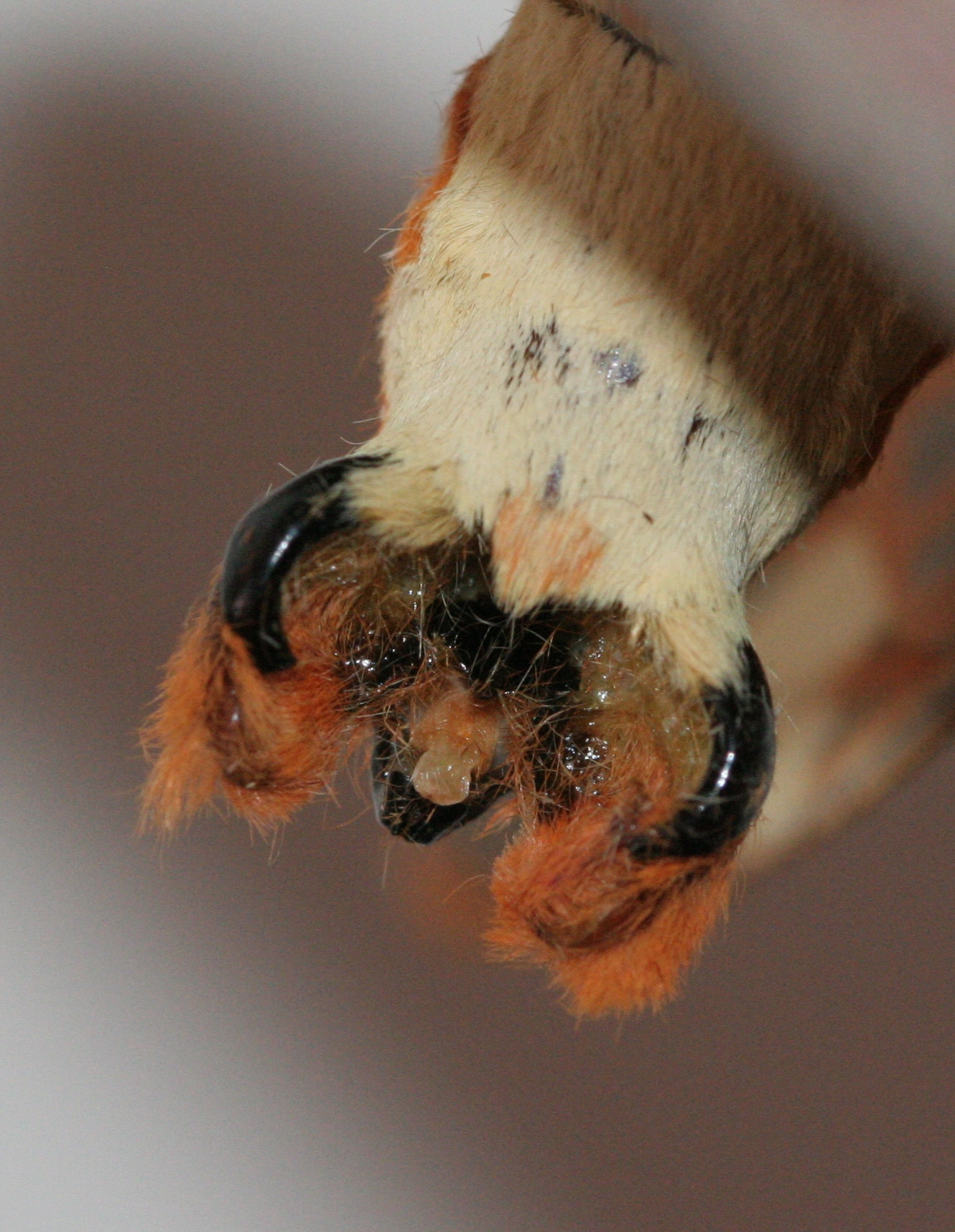
Citheronia regalis with claspers open

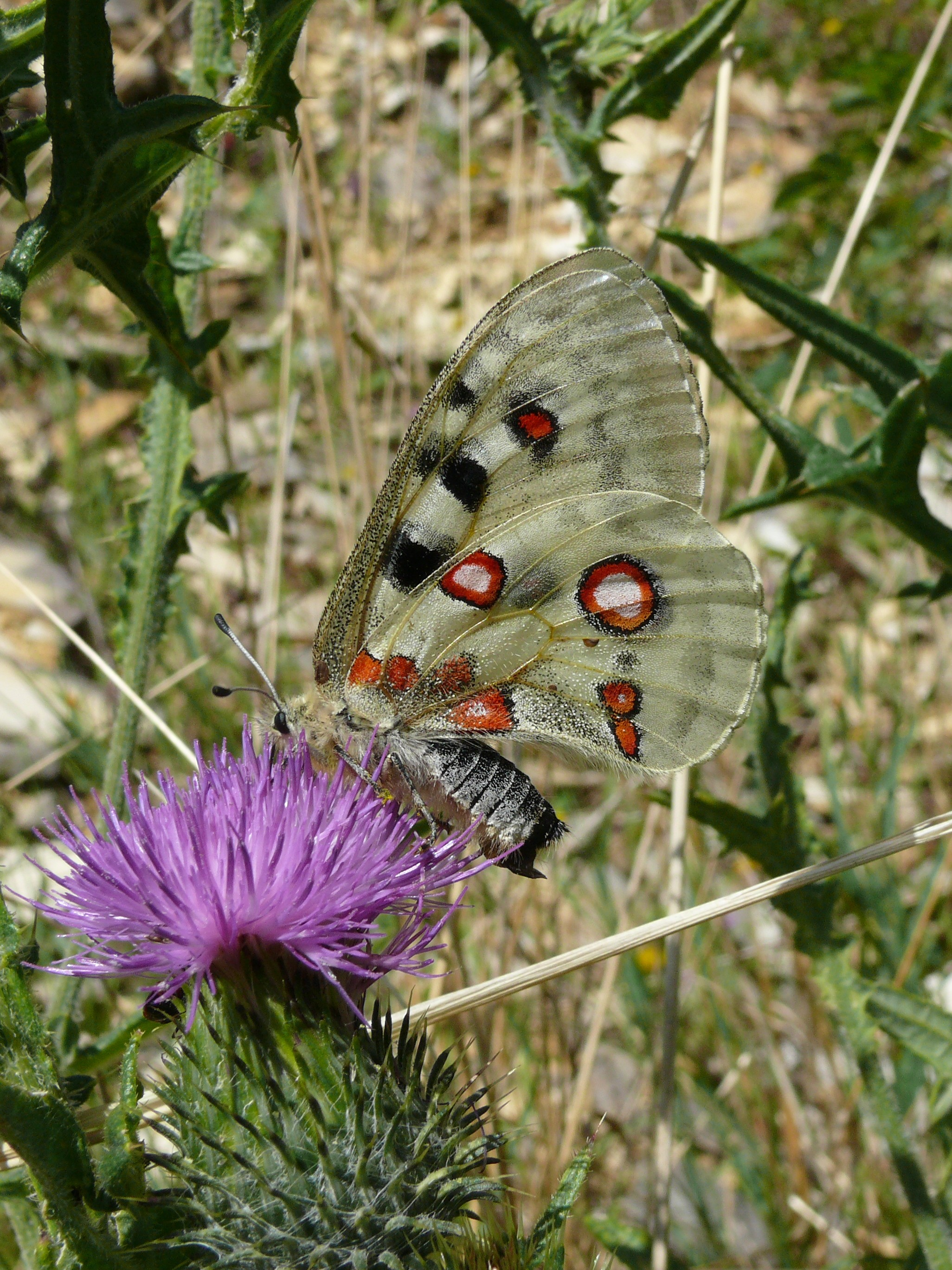
Female Apollo with sphragis or mating plug

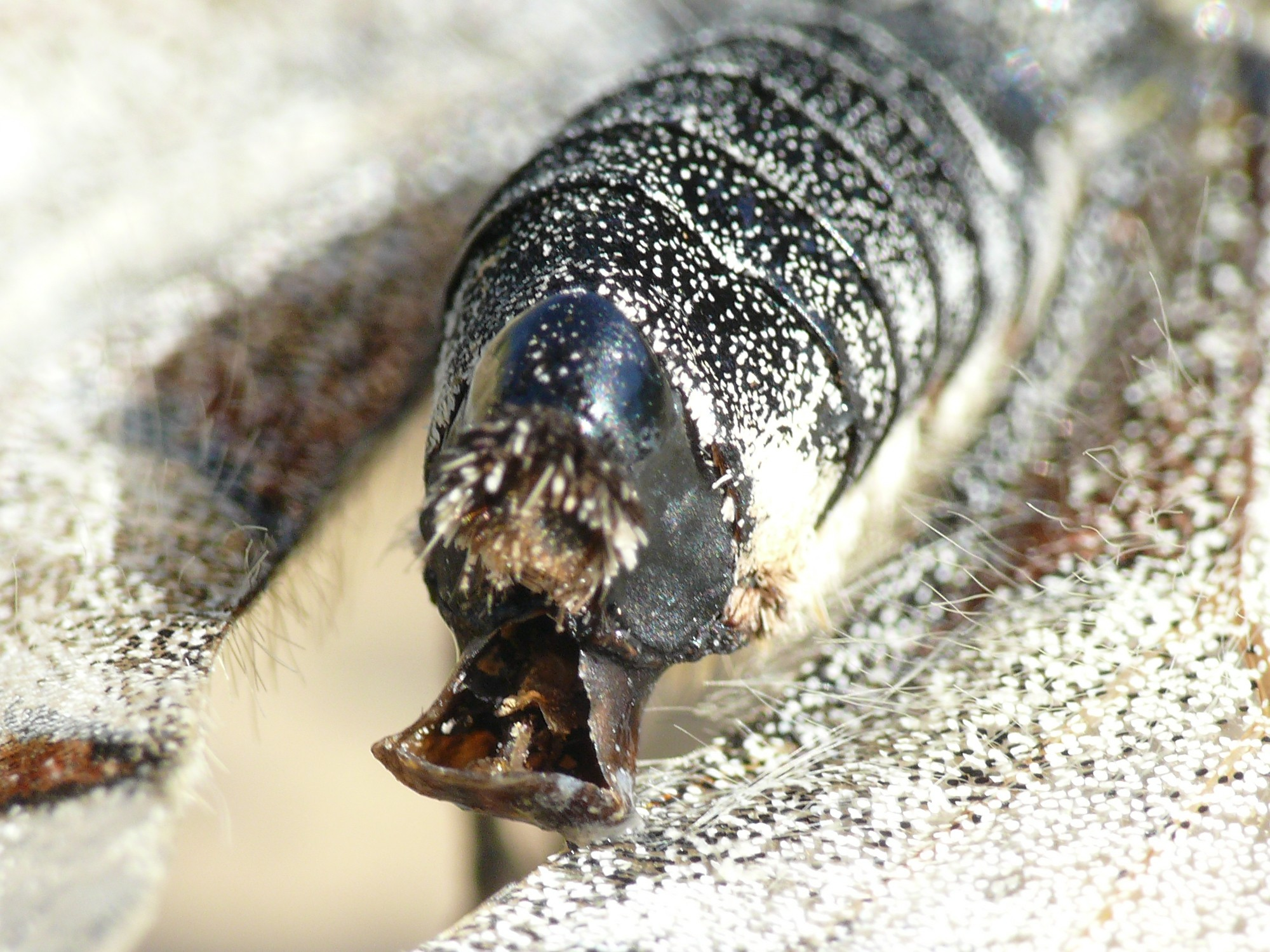
Close up of the hardened sphragis extruding 2 to 3 mm behind the abdomen of Parnassius

=== Cloaca ===
Lepidopteran insects feature a cloaca at the end of the abdomen. This may be complete, incorporating the anus, the ovipore and the copulatory pore, as in the case of the Dacnonypha, Zeugloptera and the majority of the Monotrysia; or incomplete, incorporating the anus and ovipore only, as found in some of the Monotrysia, the Psychidae, and in some Choreutidae and Cossidae.

== Development ==
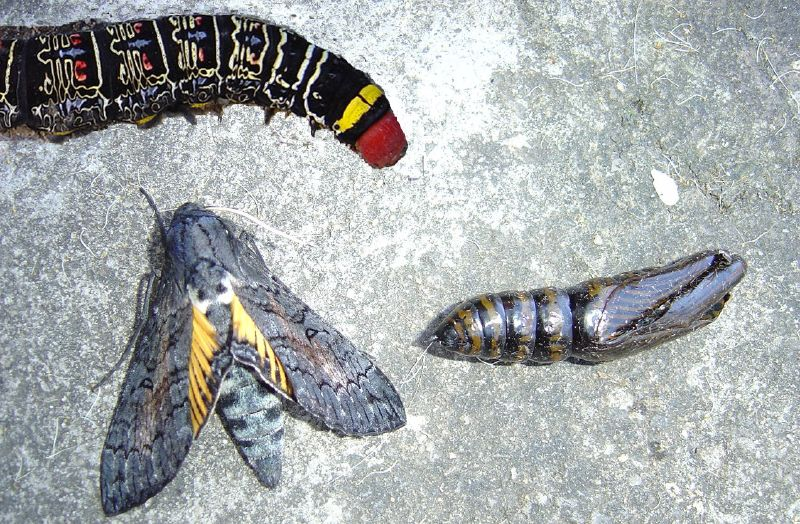
Three stages of a sphingid moth – larva (or caterpillar), chrysalis (or pupa), and adult (or imago)

The fertilised egg matures and hatches to give a caterpillar. The caterpillar is the feeding stage of the lepidopteran life cycle. The caterpillar needs to be able to feed and to avoid being eaten and much of its morphology has evolved to facilitate these two functions. After growth and ecdysis, the caterpillar enters into a sessile developmental stage called a pupa (or chrysalis) around which it may form a casing. The insect develops into the adult in the pupa stage; when ready the pupa hatches and the adult stage or imago of a butterfly or moth arises.

=== Egg ===
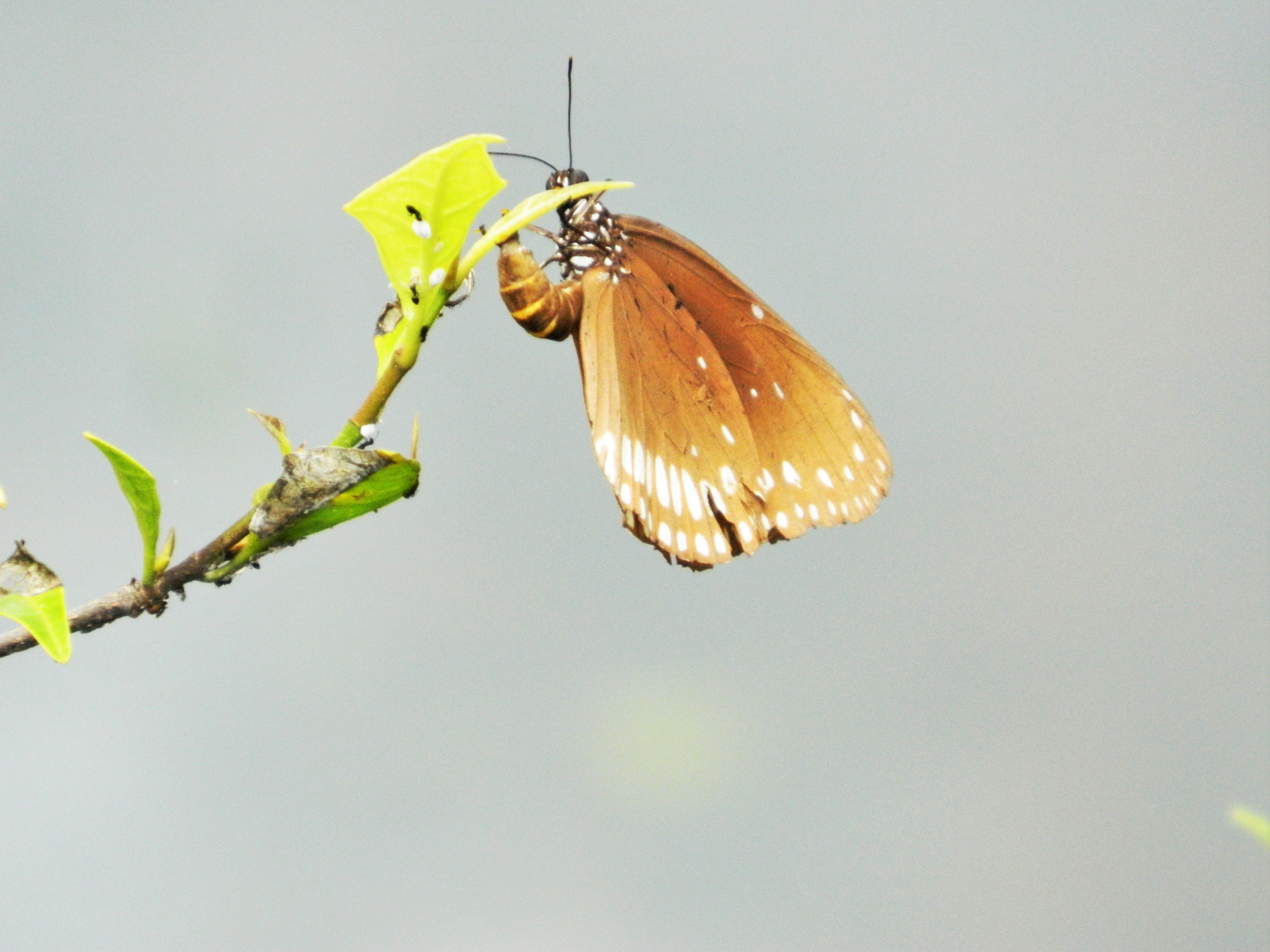
The butterfly can be seen laying eggs underneath the leaf.

Like most insects, the Lepidoptera are oviparous or "egg layers". Lepidopteran eggs, like those of other insects, are centrolecithal in that the eggs have a central yolk surrounded by cytoplasm. The yolk provides the liquid nourishment for the embryo caterpillar until it escapes from the shell. The cytoplasm is enclosed by the vitteline envelope and a proteinaceous membrane called the chorion protects the egg externally. The zygote nucleus is located posteriorly.

In some species of Lepidoptera, a waxy layer is present inside the chorion adjacent to the vitelline layer which is thought to have evolved to prevent desiccation. In insects, the chorion has a layer of air pores in the otherwise solid material which provides very limited capability for respiratory function. In Lepidoptera, the chorion layer above this air pore layer is lamellar with successive sheets of protein arranged in a particular direction and stepped so as to form a helical arrangement.

The top of the egg is depressed and forms a small central cavity called micropyle through which the egg is fertilised. The micropyle is situated on top in eggs which are globular, conical, or cylindrical; in those eggs which are flattened or lenticular, the micropyle is located on the outer margin or rim.

The eggs of Lepidoptera are usually rounded and small (1 mm) though they may be as large as 4 mm in the case of Sphingidae and Saturniidae. They are generally quite plain in colour, white, pale green, bluish green, or brown. Butterfly and moth eggs come in various shapes; some are spherical, others hemispherical, conical, cylindrical, or lenticular (lens shaped). Some are barrel shaped or pancake shaped, while others are turban or cheese shaped. They may be angled or depressed at both ends, ridged or ornamented, spotted or blemished.

The eggs are deposited singly, in small clusters, or in a mass, and invariably on or near the food source. Captive moths have been known to lay eggs in the cages they have been sequestered in. Egg size in the Lepidoptera is affected by a number of factors. Lepidoptera species which overwinter in the egg stage usually have larger eggs than the species that do not. Similarly, species feeding on woody plants in the larval stage have larger eggs than those species feeding on herbaceous plants. Eggs laid by older females of a few butterfly species have been noted to be smaller in size than their younger counterparts. In the absence of adequate nutrition, the females of the corn-borer moth ( Ostrinia spp.) have been recorded to lay clutches with egg sizes below normal.

While escaping, the newly hatched larvae of many species sometimes eat the chorion to emerge. Alternatively, the egg shell may have a line of weakness around the cap which gives way allowing the larva to emerge. The egg shell and a small amount of yolk trapped in the amniotic membranes forms the first food for most lepidopteran larvae.

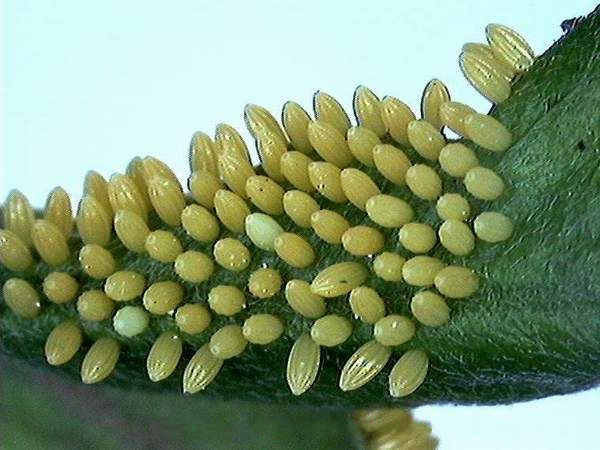
Eggs of pioneer (Anaphaeis aurota family Pieridae)

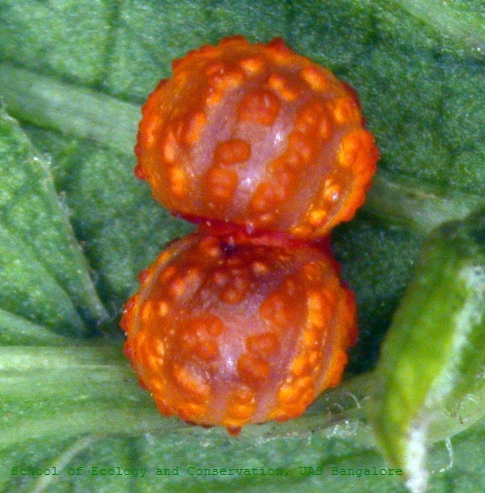
Eggs of crimson rose (Atrophaneura hector family Papilionidae)

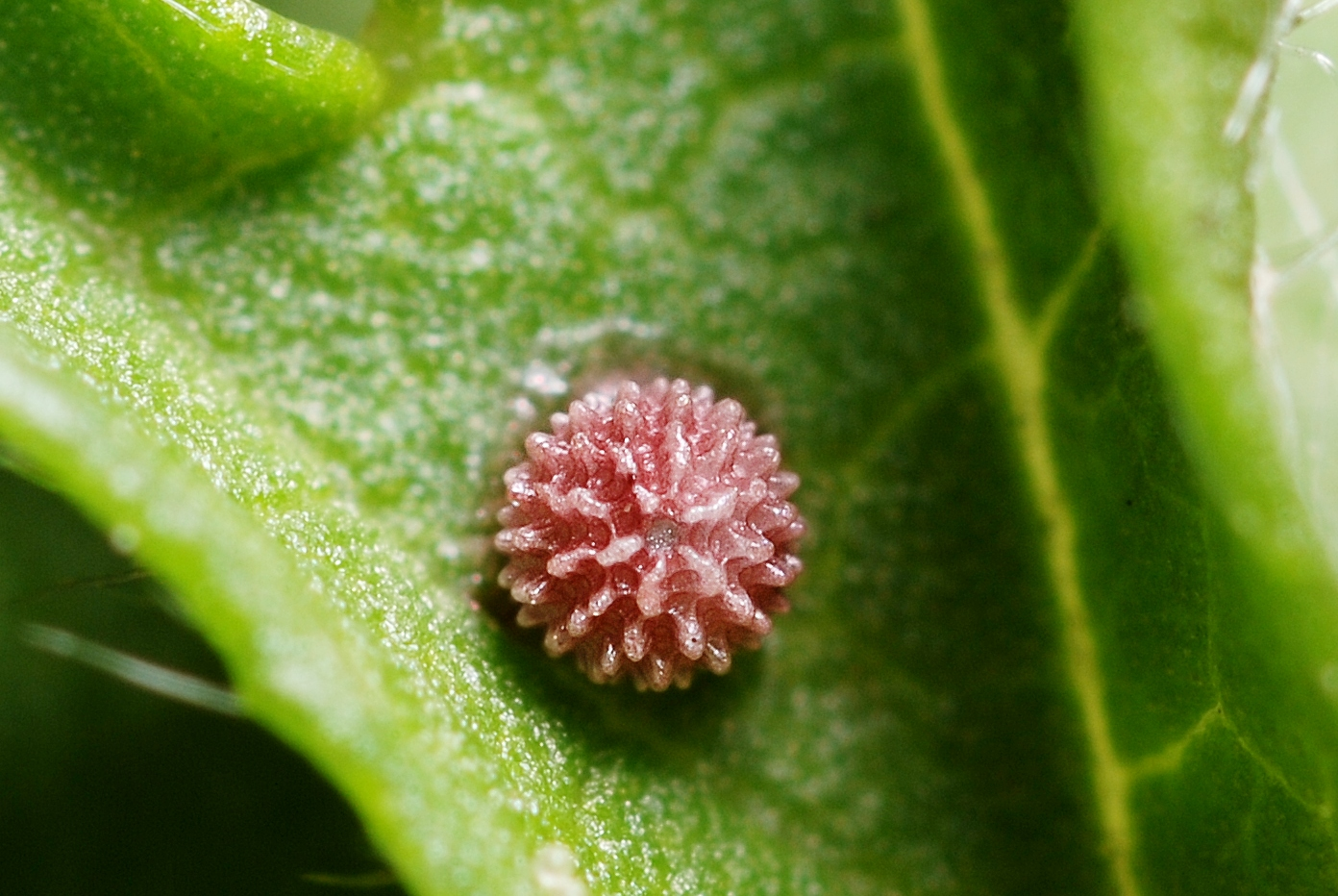
Egg of mallow skipper (Carcharodus alceae family Hesperiidae)

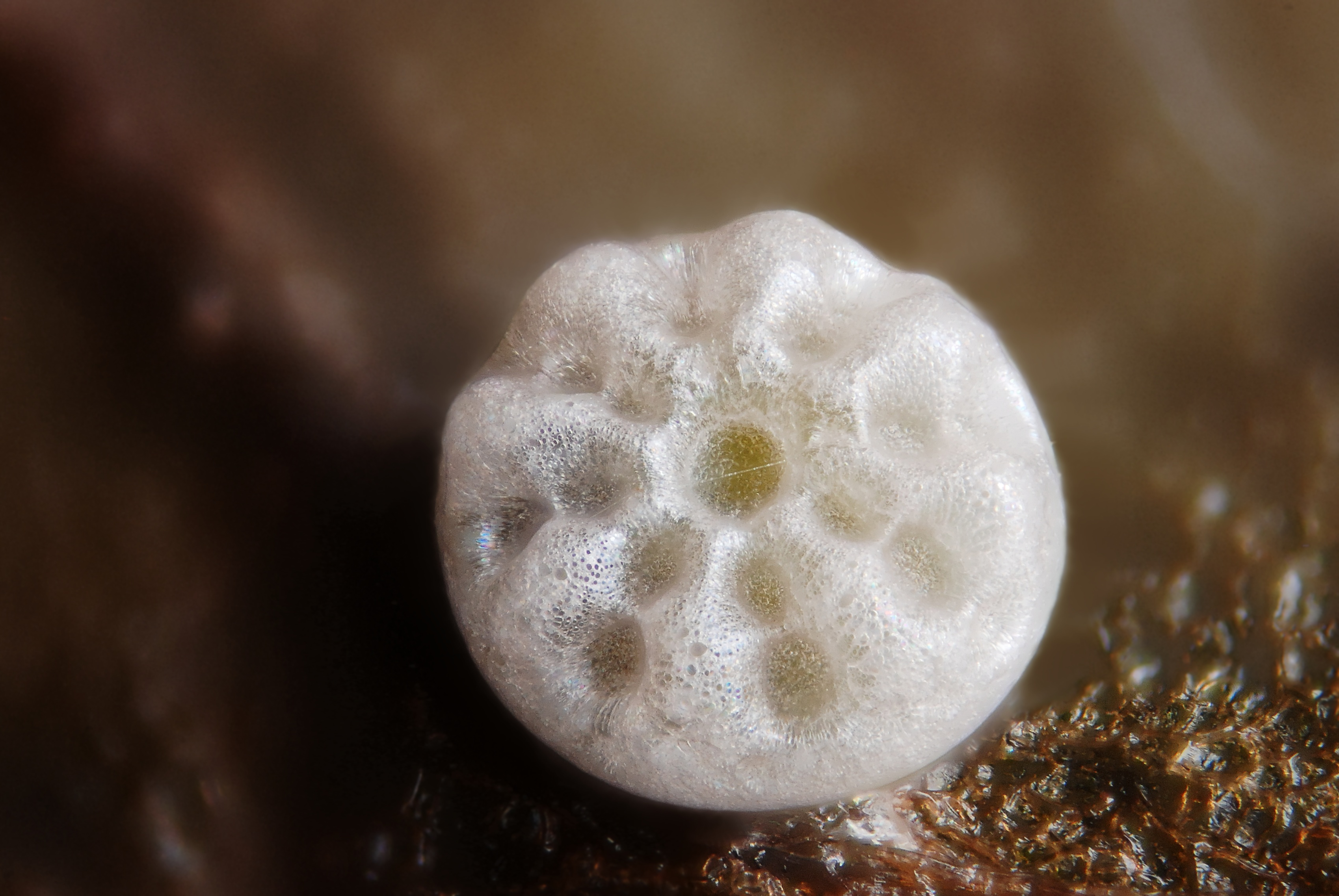
Egg of large copper (Lycaena dispar family Lycaenidae)
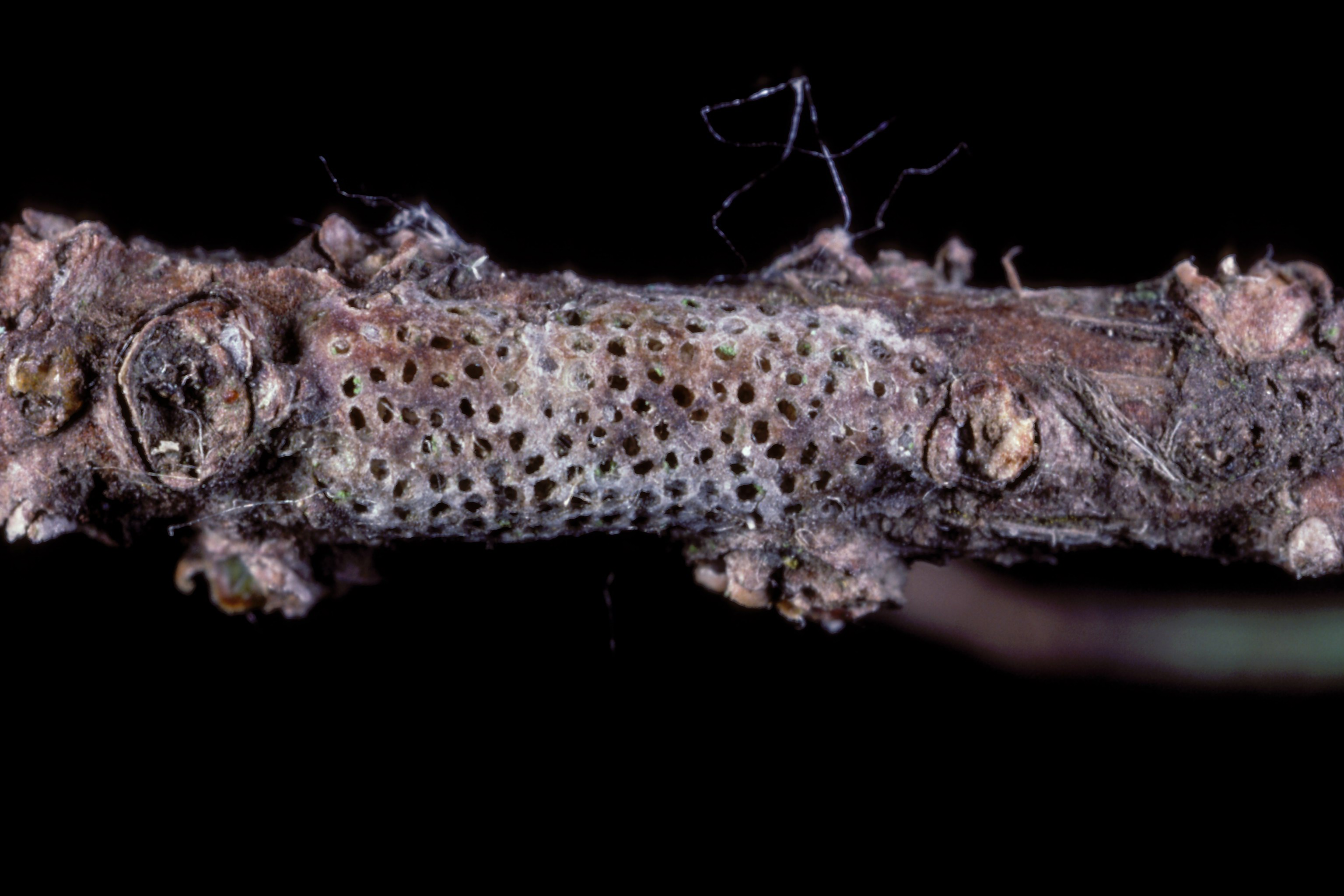
Side by side eggs of ditrysian lepidopteran, baldcypress leafroller (Archips goyerena family Tortricidae)

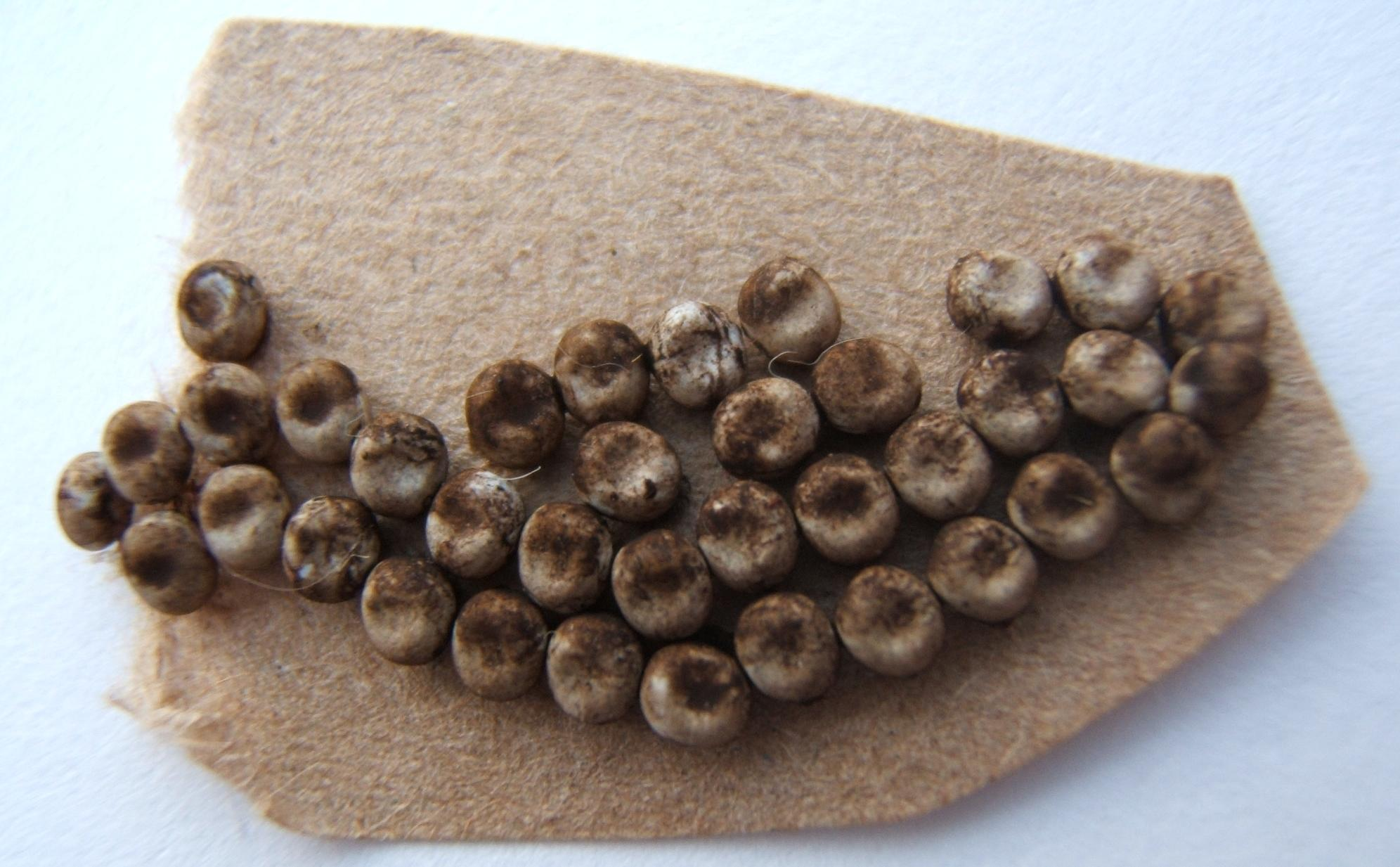
Upright eggs of ditrysian lepidopteran, moon moth (Actias luna family Saturniidae) laid in captivity on paper

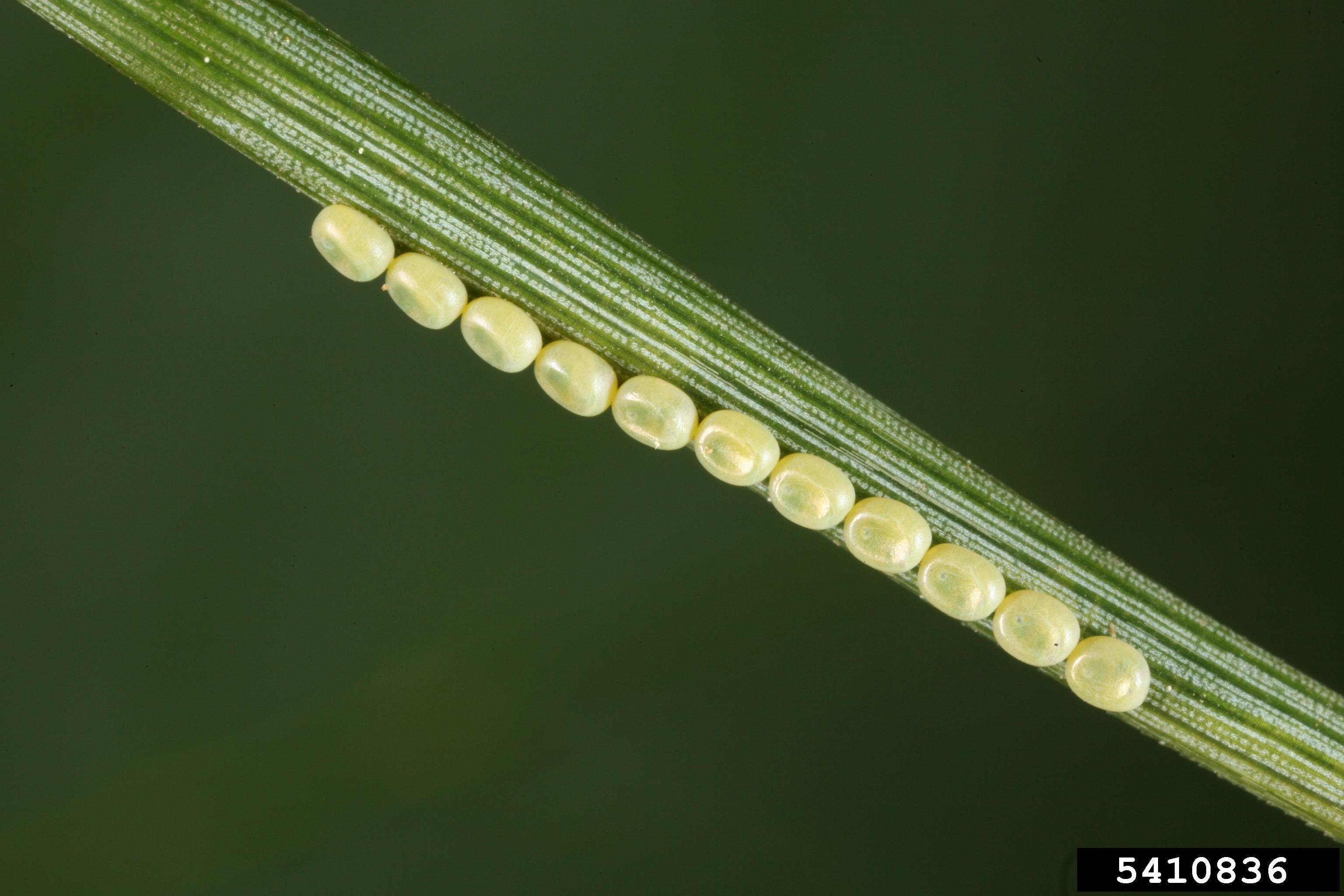
Eggs of pine looper moth (Bupalus piniaria family Geometridae)

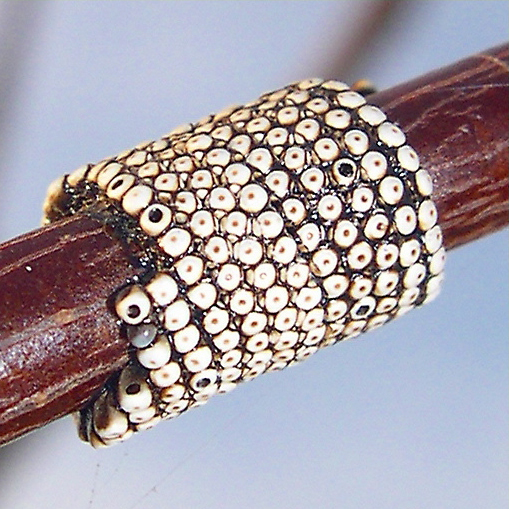
Eggs of lackey moth (Malacosoma neustria family Lasiocampidae)

=== Caterpillar ===
A – head, B – thorax, C – abdomen, 1 – prothoracic shield, 2 – spiracle, 3 – true legs, 4 – midabdominal prolegs, 5 – anal proleg, 6 – anal plate, 7 – tentacle, a – eye, b – stemmata (ocelli), c – antenna, d – mandible, e – labrum, f – frontal triangle.

Caterpillars, are "characteristic polypod larvae with cylindrical bodies, short thoracic legs and abdominal prolegs (pseudopods)". They have a toughened (sclerotised) head capsule, mandibles (mouthparts) for chewing, and a soft tubular, segmented body, that may have hair-like or other projections, three pairs of true legs, and additional prolegs (up to five pairs). The body consists of thirteen segments, of which three are thoracic (T1, T2, and T3) and ten are abdominal (A1 to A10).

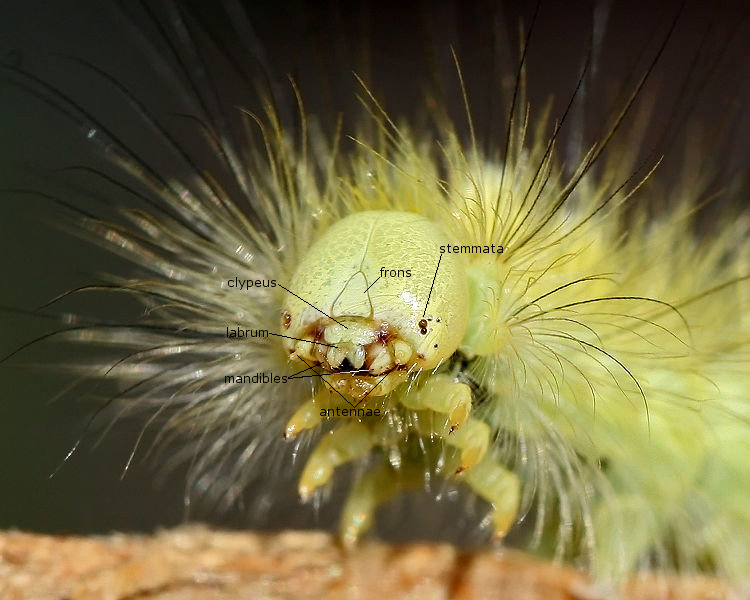
Caterpillar head morphology (click to enlarge)

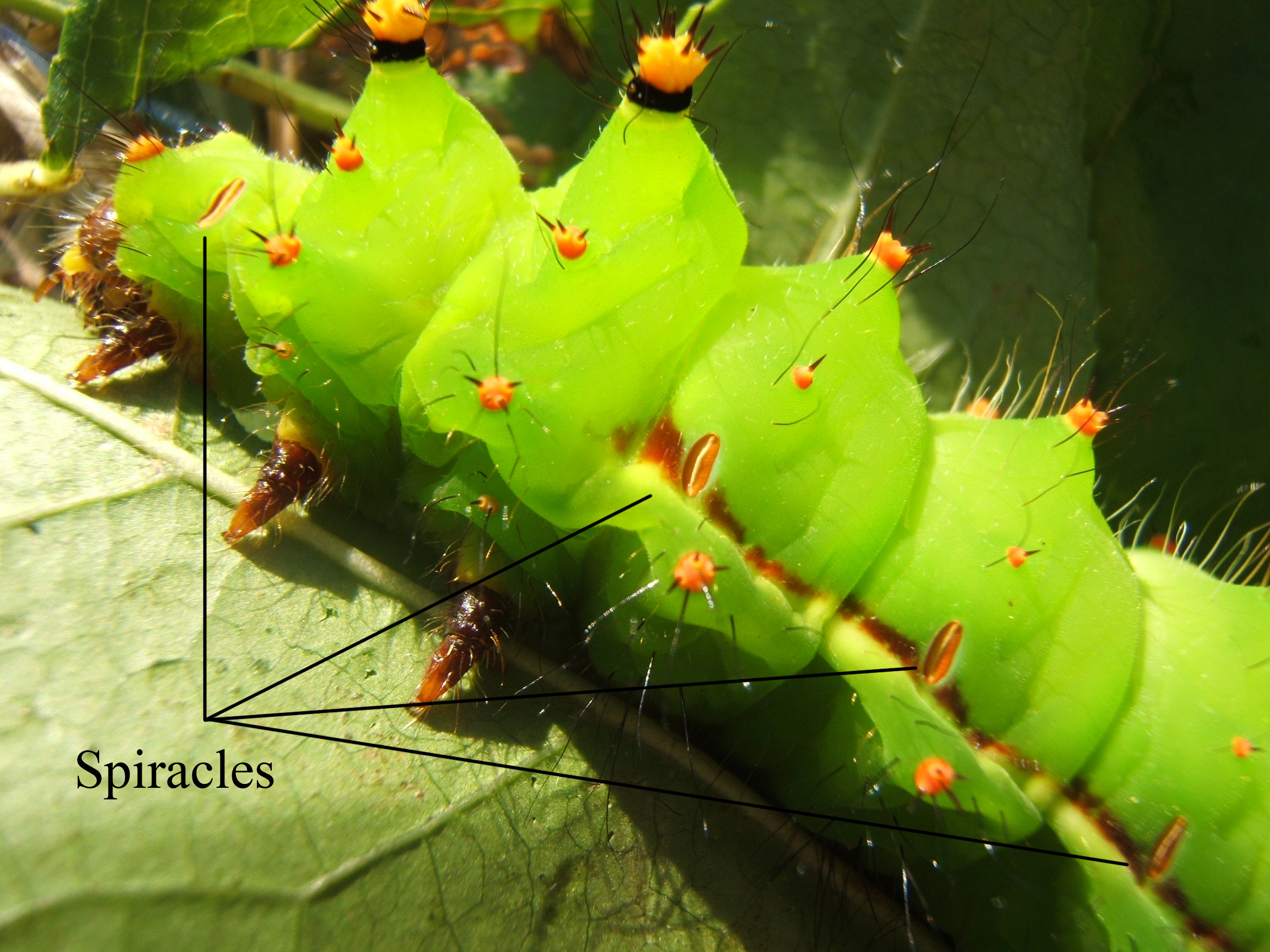
Spiracles on caterpillar of Actias selene

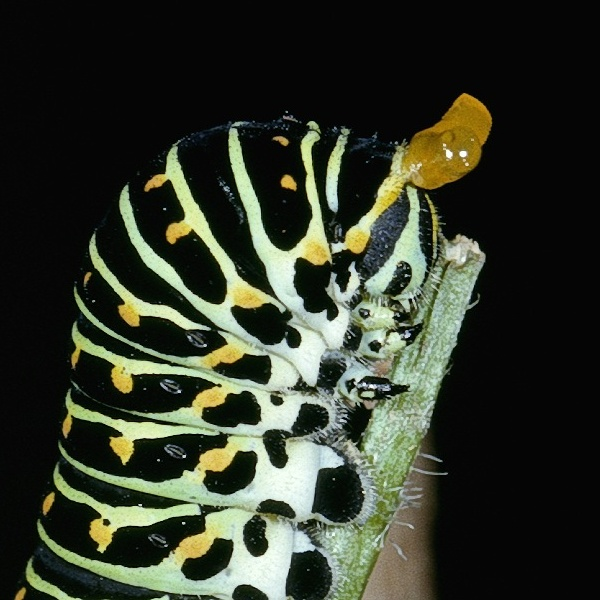
Old World swallowtail caterpillar everting its osmeterium in defence

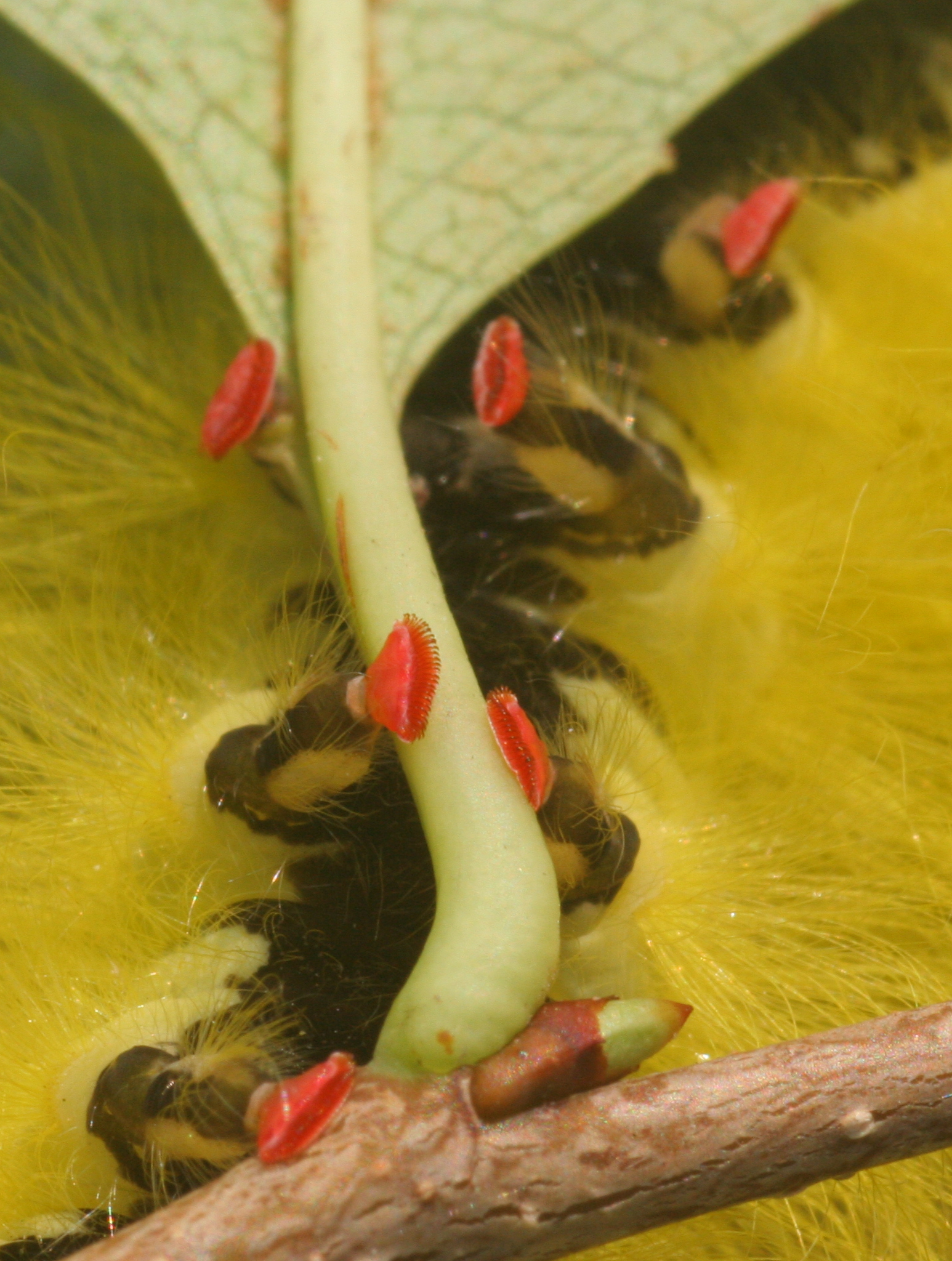
Crochets on a caterpillar's prolegs

All true caterpillars have an upside-down Y-shaped line that runs from the top of the head downward. In between the Y-shaped line lies the frontal triangle or frons. The clypeus, located below the frons, lies between the two antennae. The labrum is found below the clypeus. There is a small notch in the centre of the labrum with which the leaf edge engages when the caterpillar eats.

The larvae have silk glands which are located on the labium. These glands are modified salivary glands. They use these silk glands to make silk for cocoons and shelters. Located below the labrum are the mandibles. On each side of the head there are usually six stemmata just above the mandibles. These stemmata are arranged in a semicircle. Below the stemmata there is a small pair of antennae, one on each side.

The thorax bears three pairs of legs, one pair on each segment. The prothorax (T1) has a functional spiracle which is actually derived from the mesothorax (T2) while the metathorax has a reduced spiracle which is not externally open and lies beneath the cuticle. The thoracic legs consist of coxa, trochanter, femur, tarsus, and claw and are constant in form throughout the order. However they are reduced in the case of certain leaf-miners and elongated in certain Notodontidae. In Micropterigidae, the legs are three-segmented, as the coxa, trochanter, and femur are fused.

Abdominal segments three through six and ten may each bear a pair of legs that are more fleshy. The thoracic legs are known as true legs and the abdominal legs are called prolegs. The true legs vary little in the Lepidoptera except for reduction in certain leaf-miners and elongation in the family Notodontidae. The prolegs contain a number of small hooks on the tip, which are known as crochets. The families of Lepidoptera differ in the number and positioning of their prolegs. Some larvae such as inchworms (Geometridae) and loopers (Plusiinae) have five pairs of prolegs or less, while others like Lycaenidae and slug caterpillars (Limacodidae) lack prolegs altogether. In some leaf-mining caterpillars there are crochets present on the abdominal wall which are reduced prolegs, while other leaf-mining species lack the crochets entirely. The abdominal spiracles are located on each side of the body on the first eight abdominal segments.

Caterpillars have different types of projections; setae (hairs), spines, warts, tubercles, and horns. The hairs come in an assortment of colours and may be long or short; single, in clusters, or in tufts; thinner at the point or clubbed at the end. A spine may either be a chalaza (having a single point) or a scolus (having multiple points). The warts may either be small bumps or short projections on the body. The tubercles are fleshy body projections that are either short and bump like or long and filament like. They usually occur in pairs or in a cluster on one or more segments. The horns are short, fleshy, and are drawn to a point. They are usually found on the eighth abdominal segment.

A large number of species of families Saturniidae, Limacodidae, and Megalopygidae have stinging caterpillars which have poisonous setae, called urticating hairs, and in the case of Lonomia – a Brazilian saturniid genus – can kill a human due to its potent anticoagulant poison. Caterpillars of many taxa that have sequestered toxic chemicals from host plants or have sharp urticating hair or spines, display aposematic colouration and markings.

Caterpillars undergo ecdysis and have a number of larval instars, usually five but varying between species. The new cuticle is soft and allows the increase in size and development of the caterpillar before becoming hard and inelastic. In the last ecdysis, the old cuticle splits and curls up into a small ball at the posterior end of the pupa and is known as the larval exuvia.

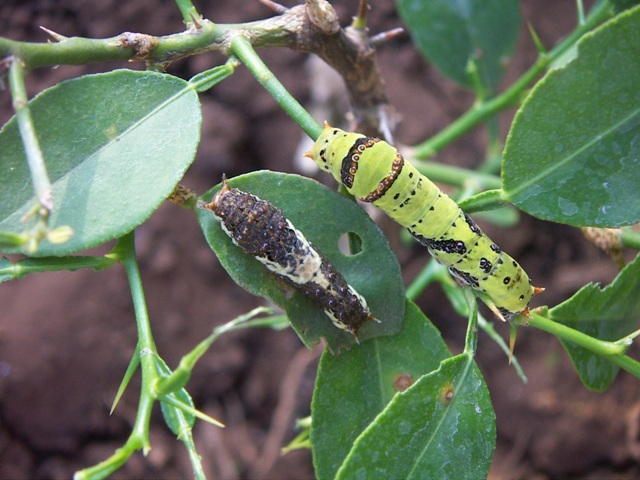
Two instars of the papilionid common Mormon with different camouflage schemes – resembling bird droppings and vegetation

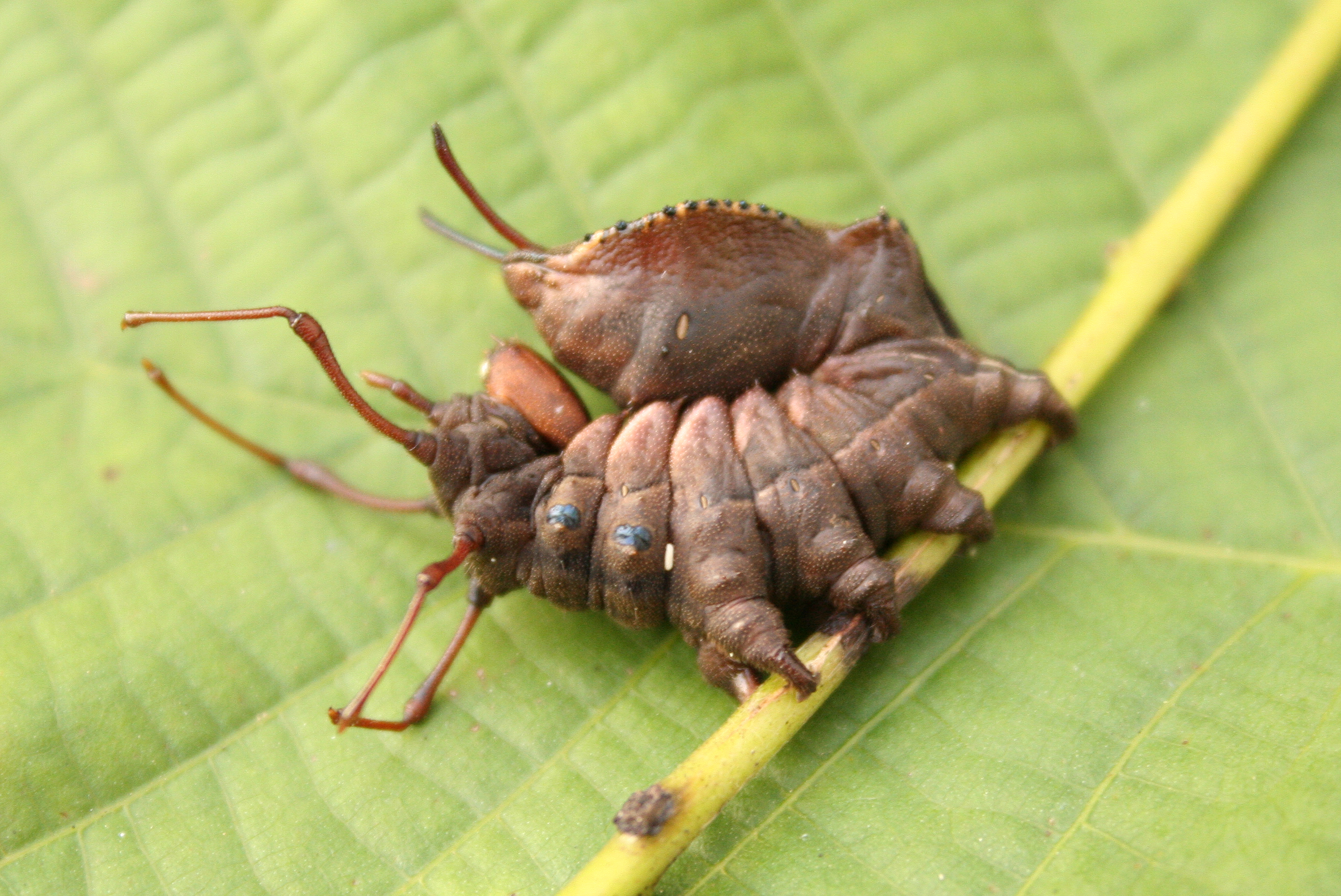
The larvae of notodontid moths, such as that of Stauropus fagi, have elongated thoracic legs.

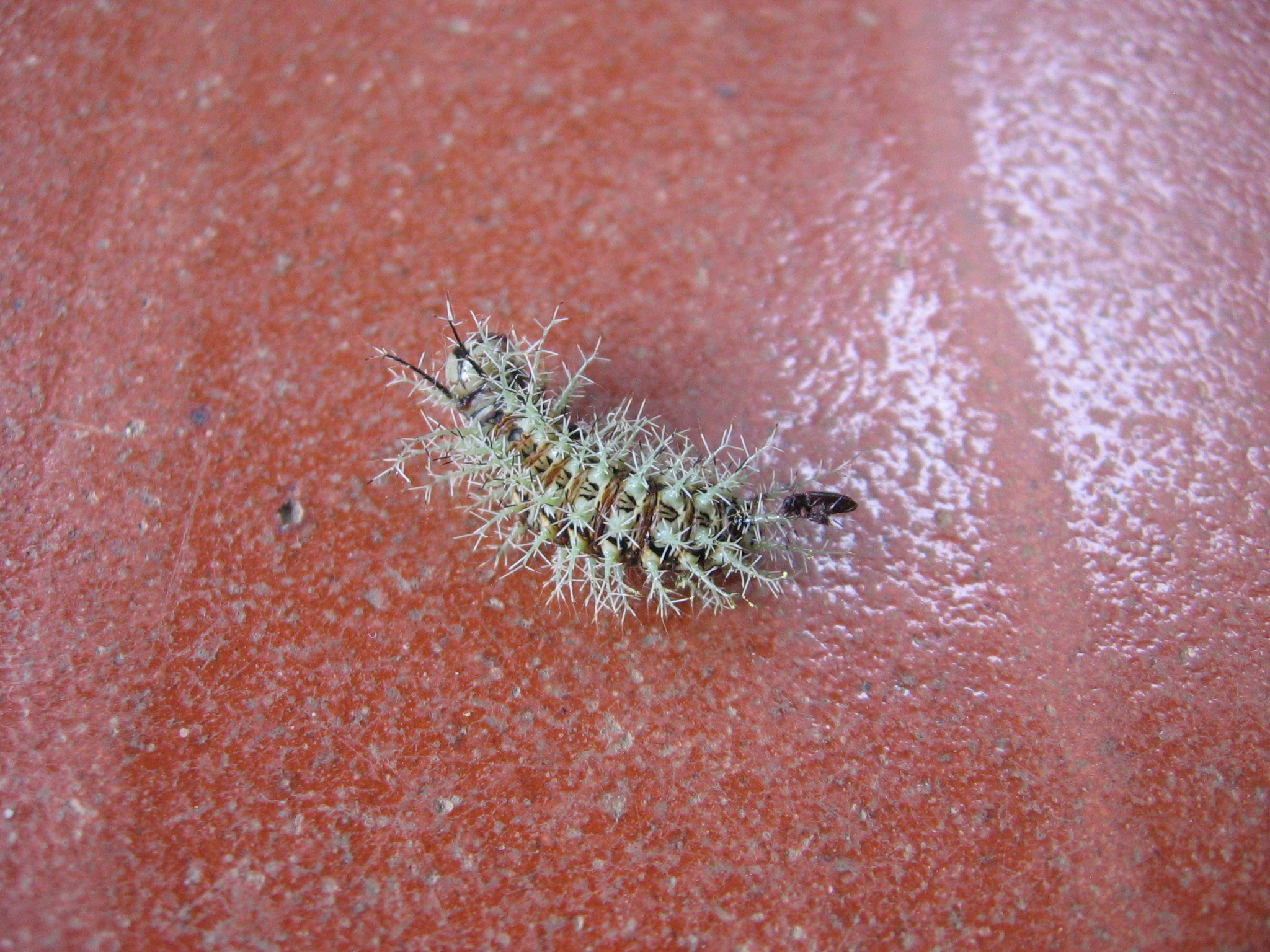
The larva of Lonomia obliqua, a saturniid moth from Brazil, has urticating hairs with a lethal anticoagulant poison.

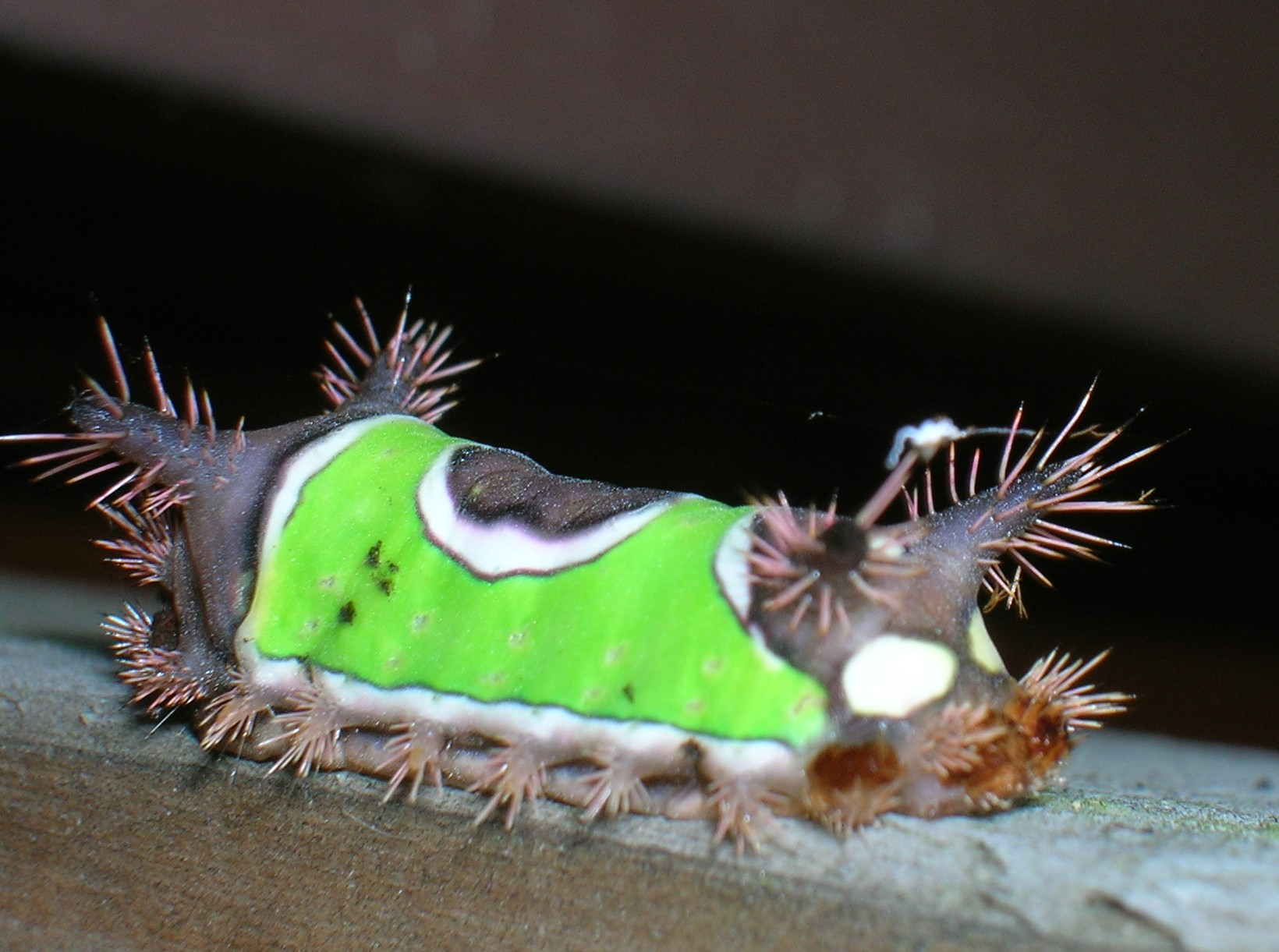
Saddleback moth (Acharia stimulea) larvae display aposematic colouring in the shape of a saddle.

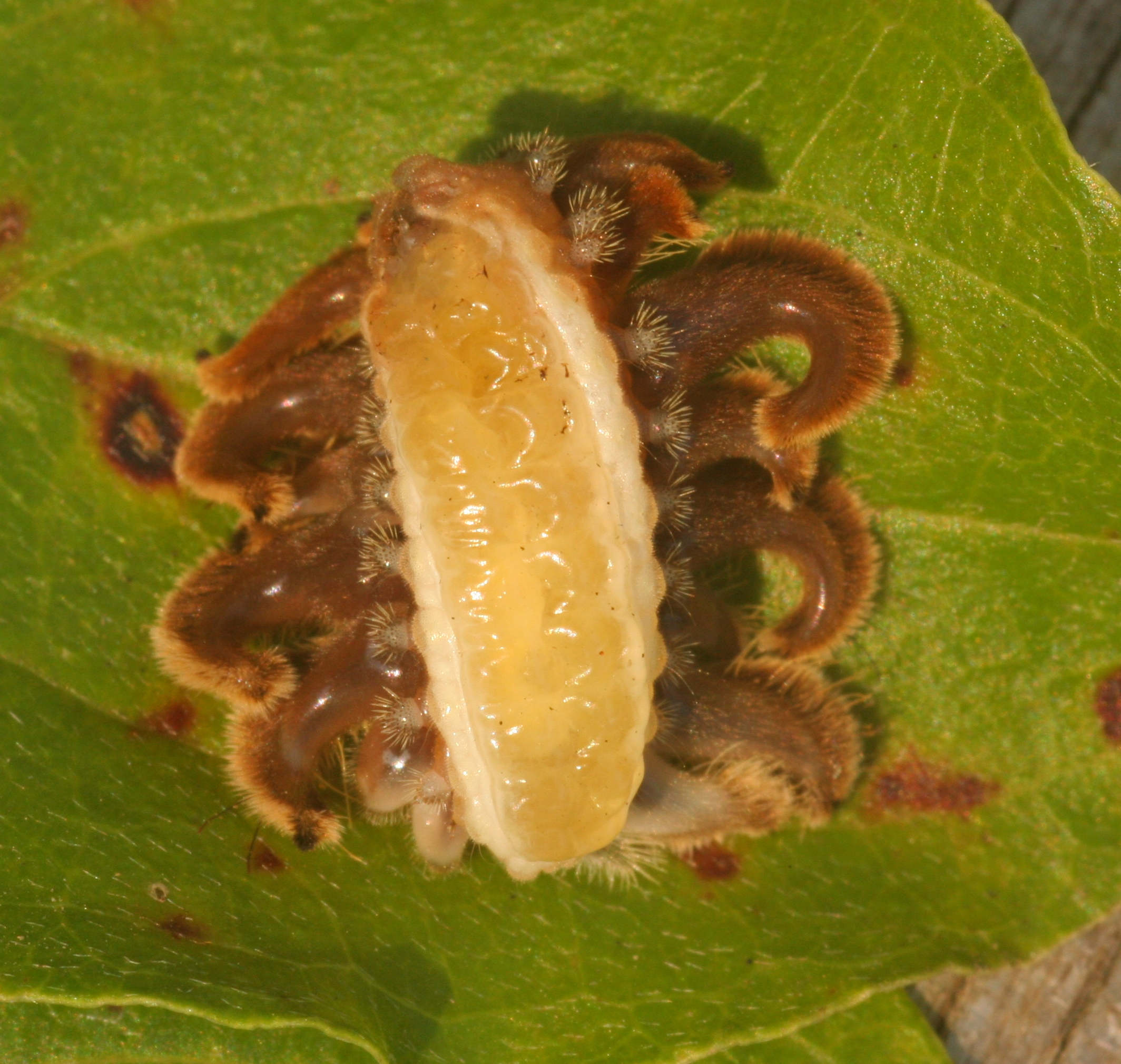
Underside of slug caterpillars of Phobetron pithecium (family Limacododiae) showing the absence of prolegs

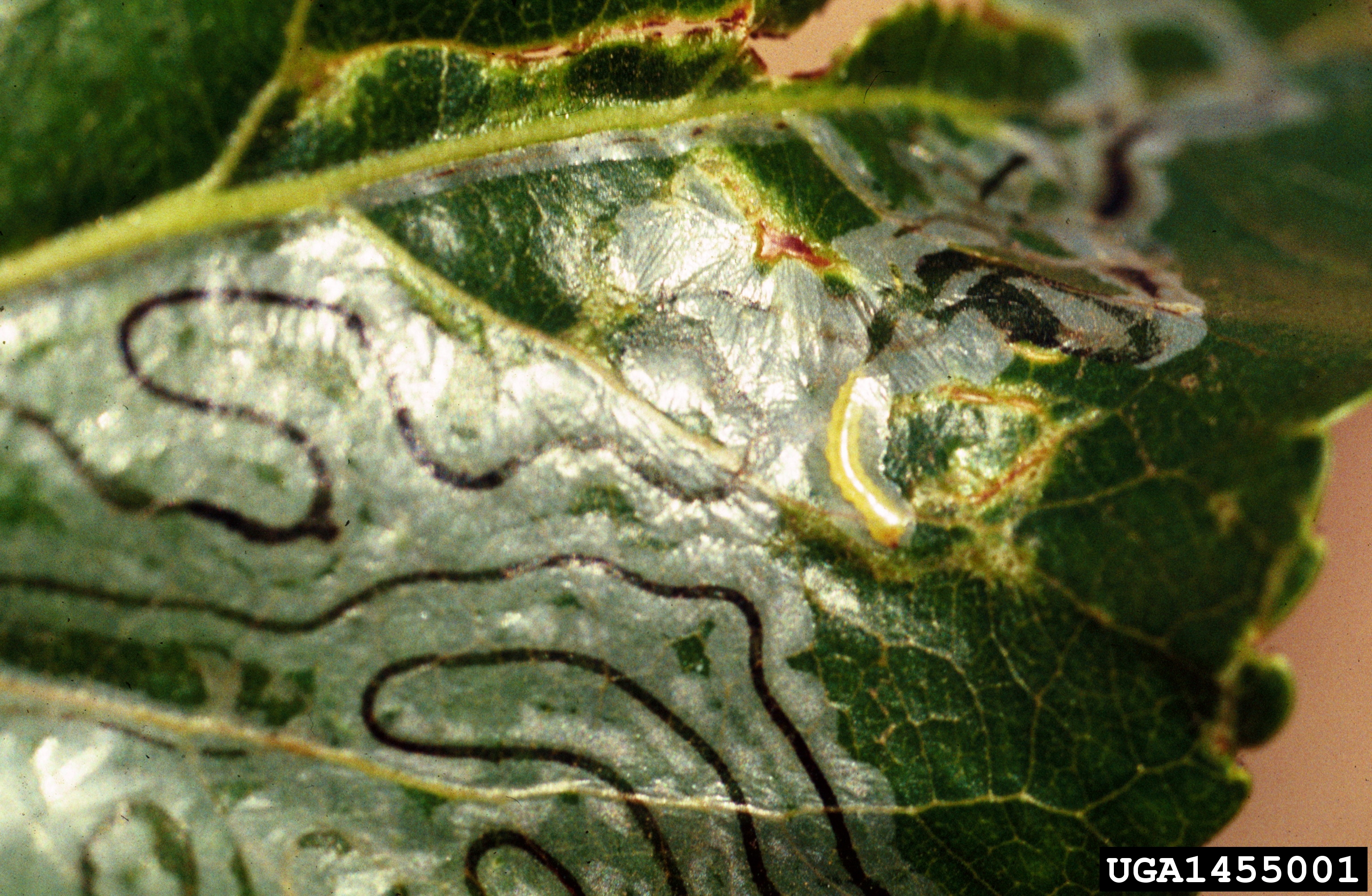
Caterpillar of common aspen leafminer (Phyllocnistis populiella)

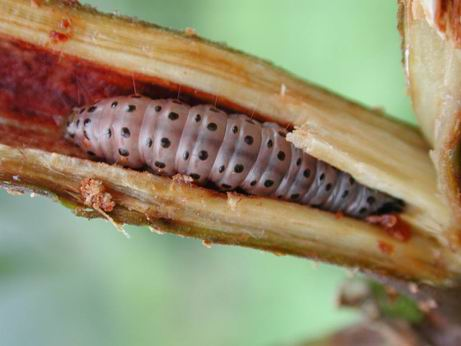
The mahogany shoot-borer (Hypsipyla grandella) damages mahogany in Brazil.

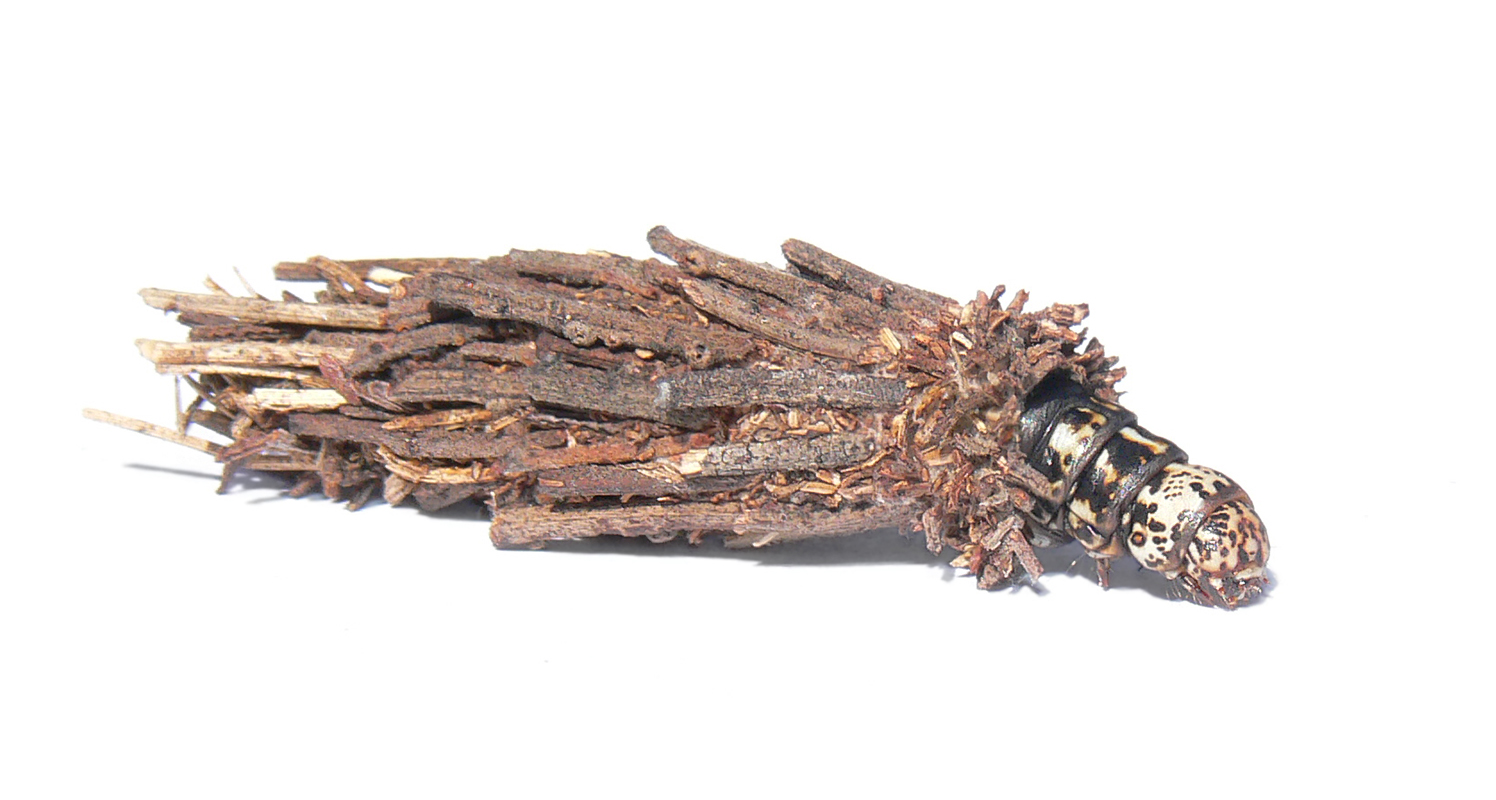
Bagworm caterpillar (possibly Hyalarcta huebneri family Psychidae) emerging from its case

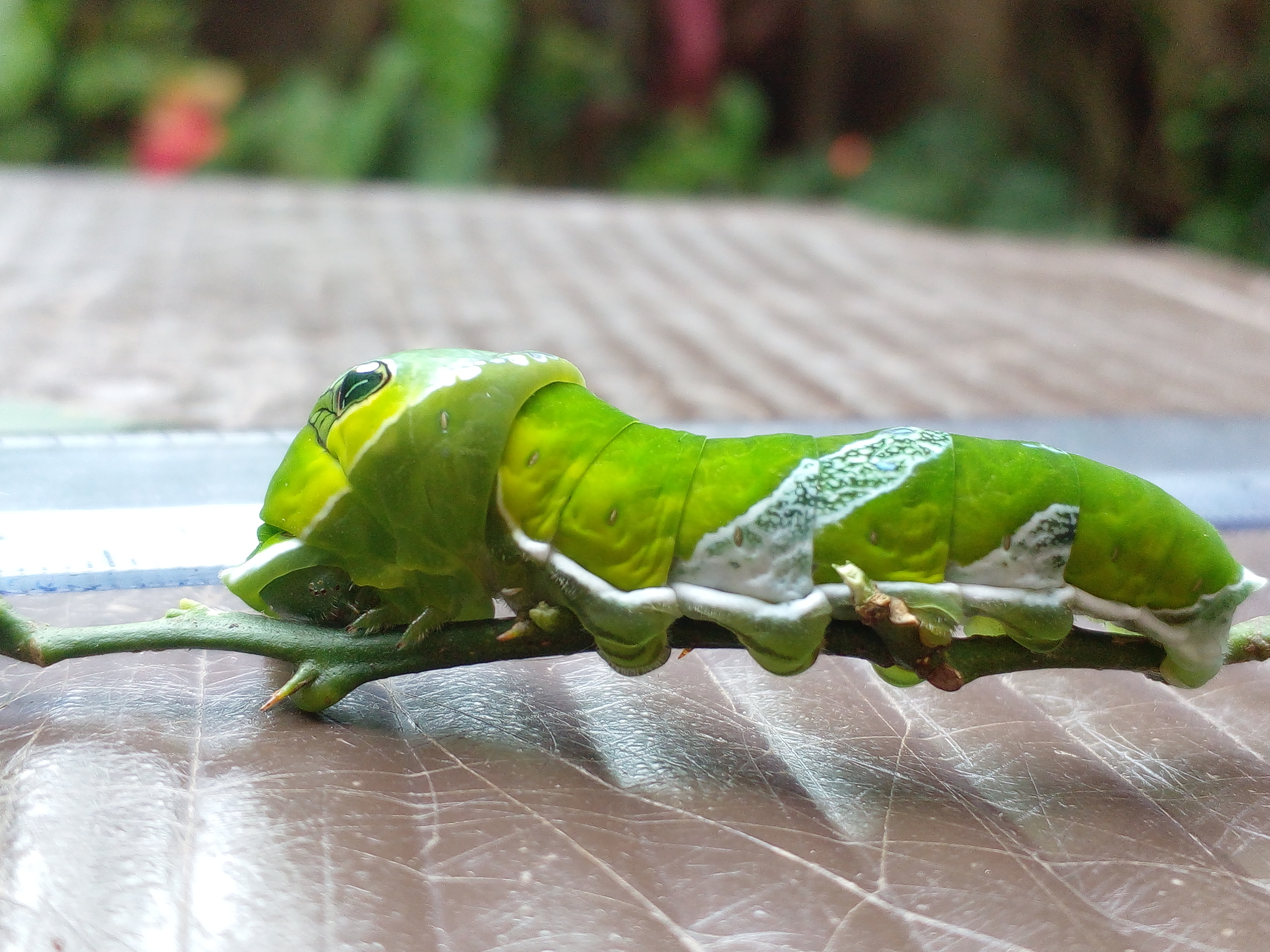
Last instar of blue Mormon larva-resembling vegetation

=== Chrysalis or pupa ===
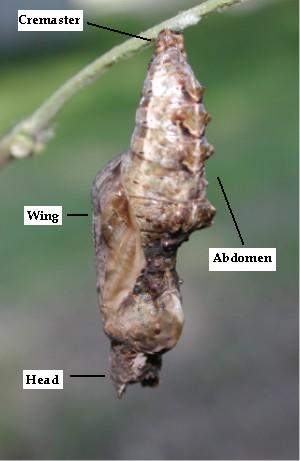
Chrysalis suspended from its cremaster

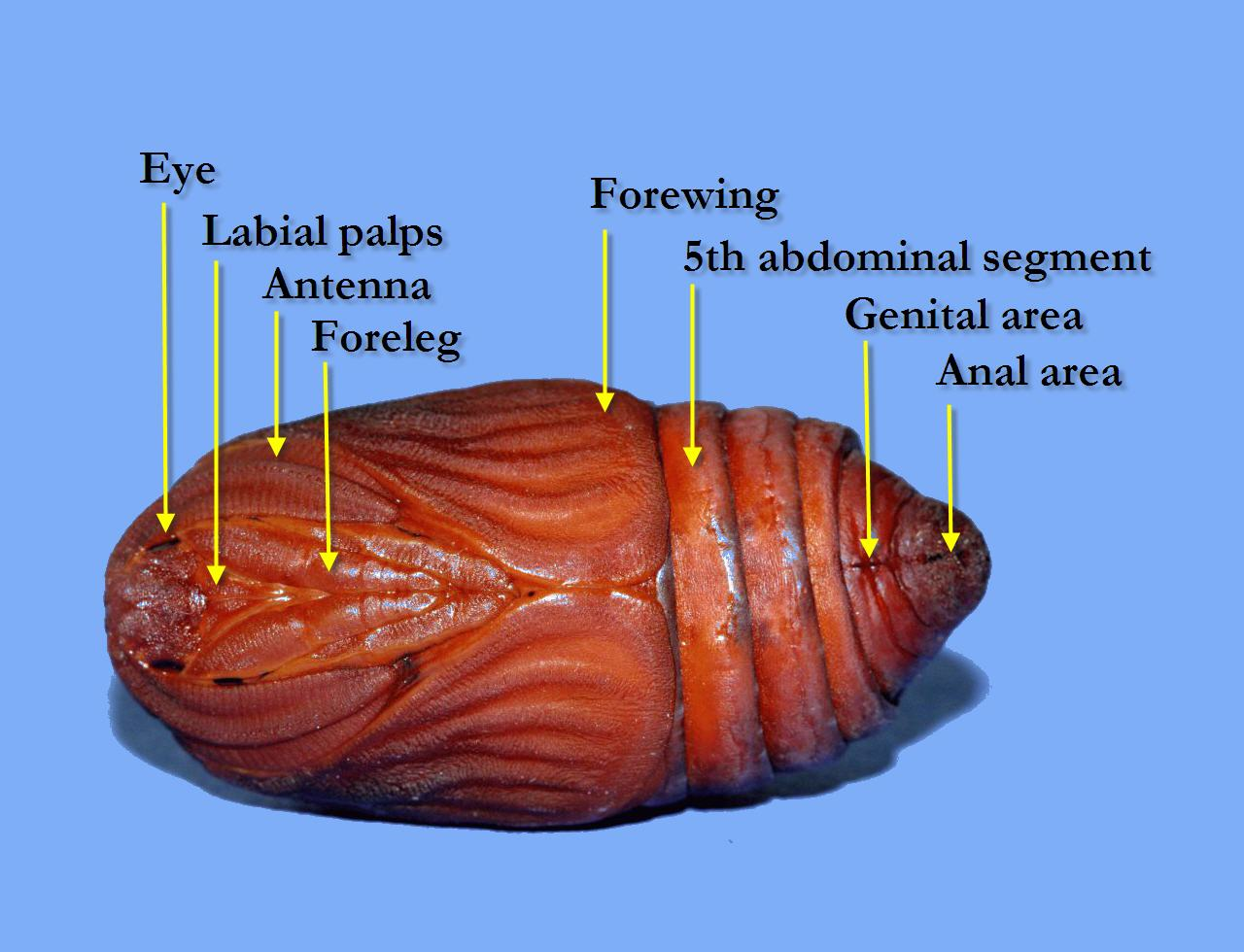
The obtect pupa of Cecropia moth showing parts

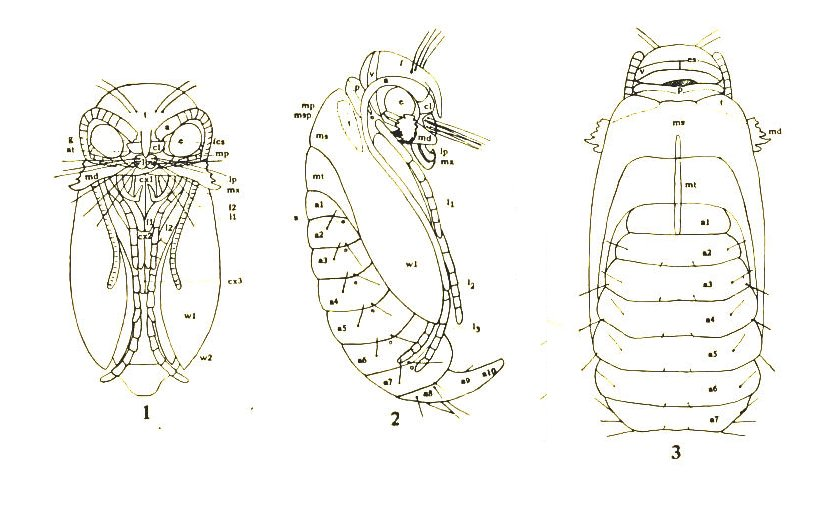
The exarate pupa of a micropterygid moth, Mnemonica auricyanea

A cocoon is a casing spun of silk by many moth caterpillars, and numerous other holometabolous insect larvae as a protective covering for the pupa. Most Lepidoptera larvae will either make a cocoon and pupate inside them or will pupate in a cell under the ground, with the exception of butterflies and advanced moths such as noctuids, whose pupae are exposed. The pupae of moths are usually brown and smooth whereas butterfly pupae are often colourful and their shape varies greatly. In butterflies, the exposed pupa is often referred to as a chrysalis, derived from the Greek term "chrysalis": χρυσός (chrysós) for gold, referring to the golden colour of some pupae.

The caterpillars of many butterflies attach themselves by a button of silk to the underside of a branch, stone, or other projecting surface. They remain attached to the silk pad by a hook-like process called a cremaster. Most chrysalids hang head downward, but in the families Papilionidae, Pieridae, and Lycaenidae, the chrysalis is held in a more upright position by a silk girdle around the middle of the chrysalis.

The pupae of most Lepidoptera are obtect, with appendages fused or glued to the body, while the rest have exarate pupae, having the antennae, legs, and wings free and not glued to the body.

During the pupal stage, the morphology of the adult is developed through elaboration from larval structures. The general aspect of the adult is visible before the outer surface hardens – the head, resting on the thorax, the eyes, antennae (brought forward over the head), the wings brought over the thorax, and the six legs between the wings and the abdomen. Among the features discernible in the head region of a pupa are sclerites, sutures, pilifers, mandibles, eye-pieces, antennae, palpi, and the maxillae. The pupal thorax displays the three thoracic segments, legs, wings, tegulae, alar furrows, and axillary tubercles. The pupal abdomen exhibits the ten segments, spines, setae, scars of larval prolegs and tubercles, anal, and genital openings, as well as spiracles. The pupa of borers display the flange-plates while those of specialised Lepidoptera exhibit the cremaster.

While the pupa is generally stationary and immobile, those of the primitive moth families Micropterigidae, Agathiphagidae, and Heterobathmiidae have fully functional mandibles. These serve principally to allow the adult to escape from the cocoon. Besides this, all appendages and the body are separate from the pupal skin and enjoy a degree of independent motion. All other superfamilies of the Lepidoptera are more specialised, have non-functional mandibles, appendages and body attached to the pupal skin, and lose a degree of independent movement.

The pupae of some moths are able to wriggle their abdomen. The three caudal segments of the pupal abdomen (segments 8–10) are fixed; the other segments are movable to some degree. While the more evolved Lepidoptera can wriggle only the last two or three segments at the end of the abdomen, more basal taxa such as the Micropterigidae can wriggle the remaining seven segments of the abdomen; this presumably helps them to protrude the anterior end from the pupal case before eclosion. The pupae of Hepialidae are able to move back and forth in the larval tunnel by wriggling, aided by projections on the back in addition to spines. Abdominal wriggling is considered to be of startle value and discouraging to predators. In the case of a few hawk moths, such as Theretra latreillii, the wriggling of the abdomens is accompanied by a rattling or clicking sound which adds to the startle effect.

In some species, such as Heliconius charithonia, mating can occur inside the pupa of females by males.

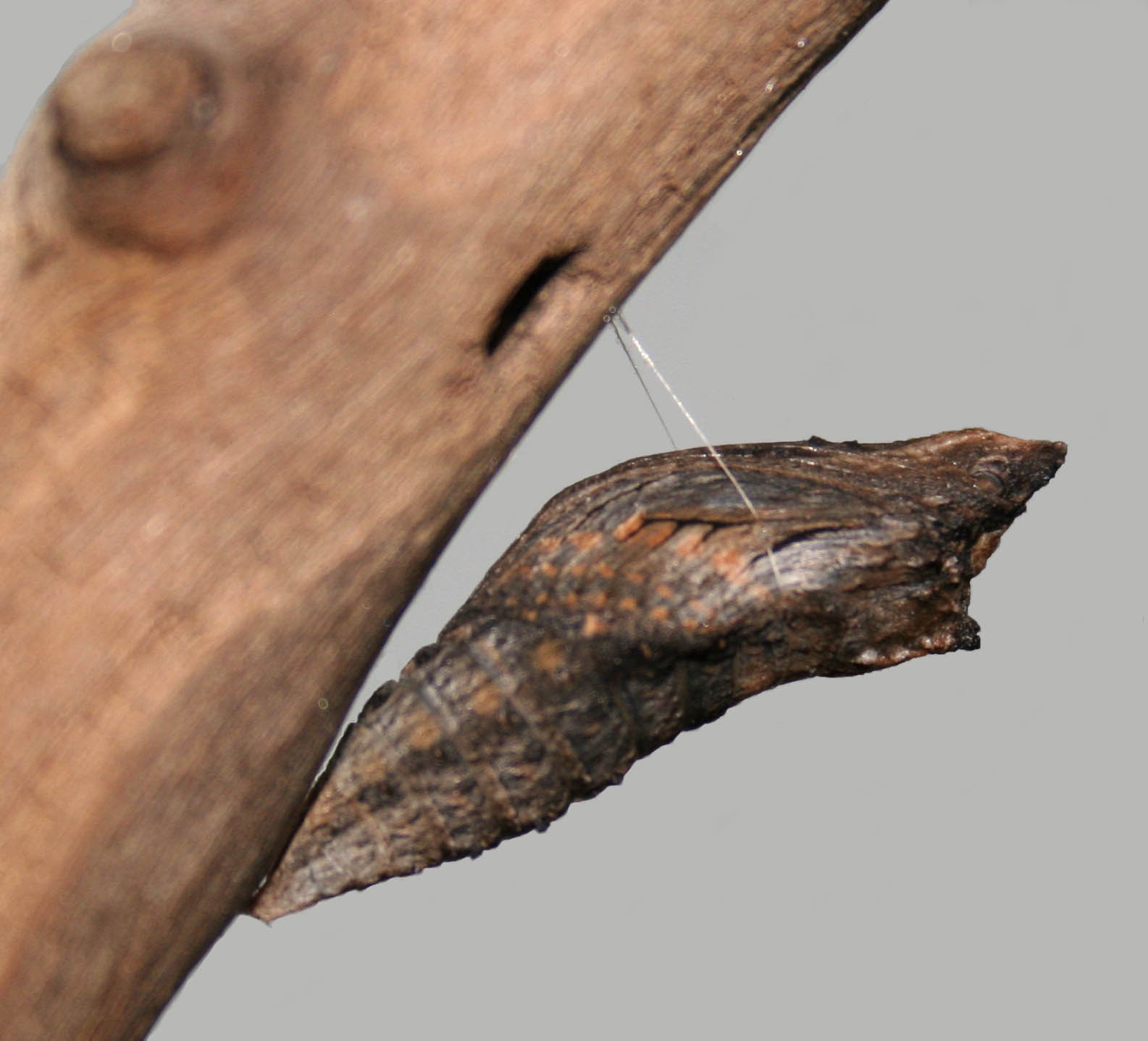
Papilionid chrysalids are typically attached to a substrate by the cremaster and with the head up held by a silk girdle.

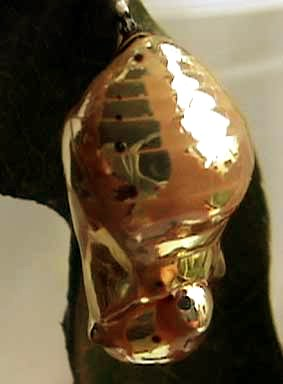
Suspended golden-coloured nymphalid chrysalis of Euploea core

Actias luna (family Saturniidae) emerging from cocoon

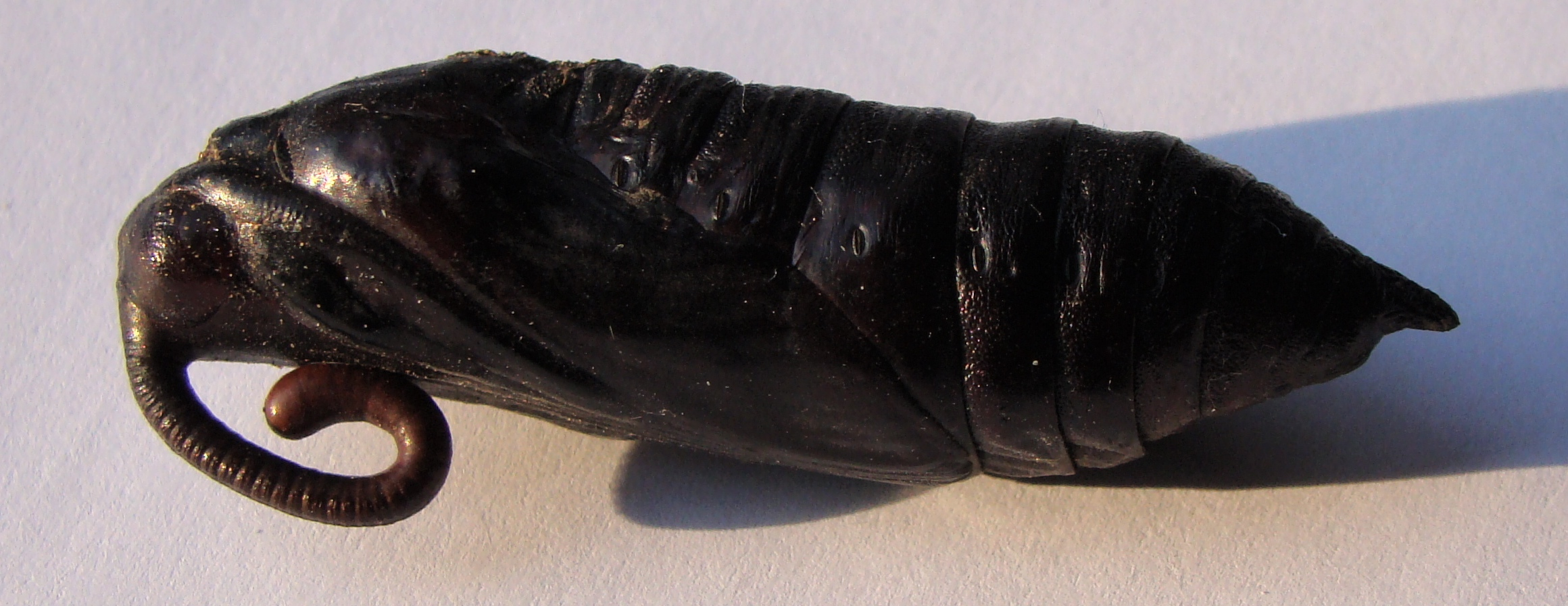
The specialised pupa of a sphingid moth, Agrius convolvuli, can wriggle its abdomen making a clicking sound, which can have a startle effect.

== Defense and predation ==
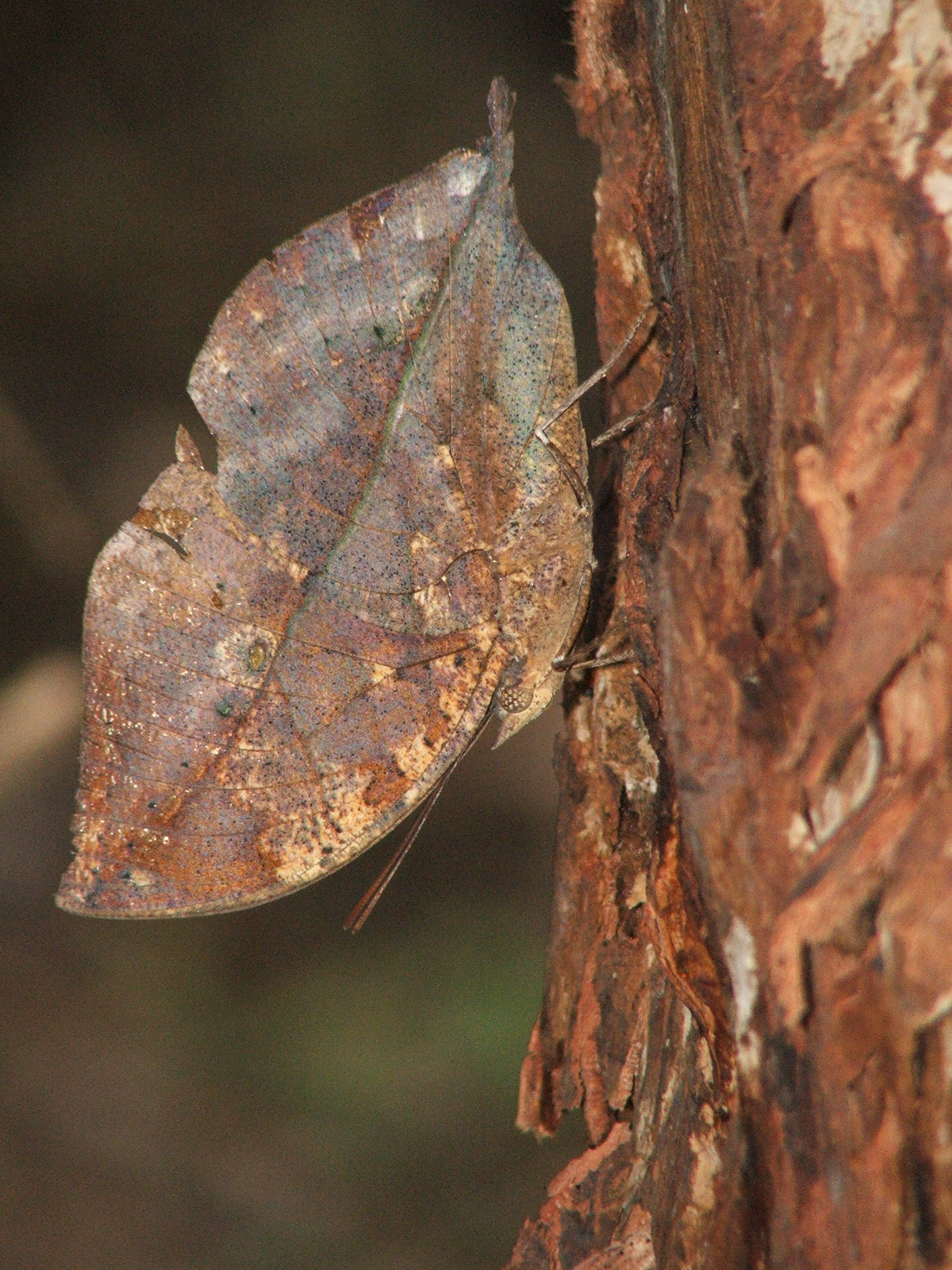
The orange oakleaf (Kallima inachus) resembles a dried leaf perfectly.

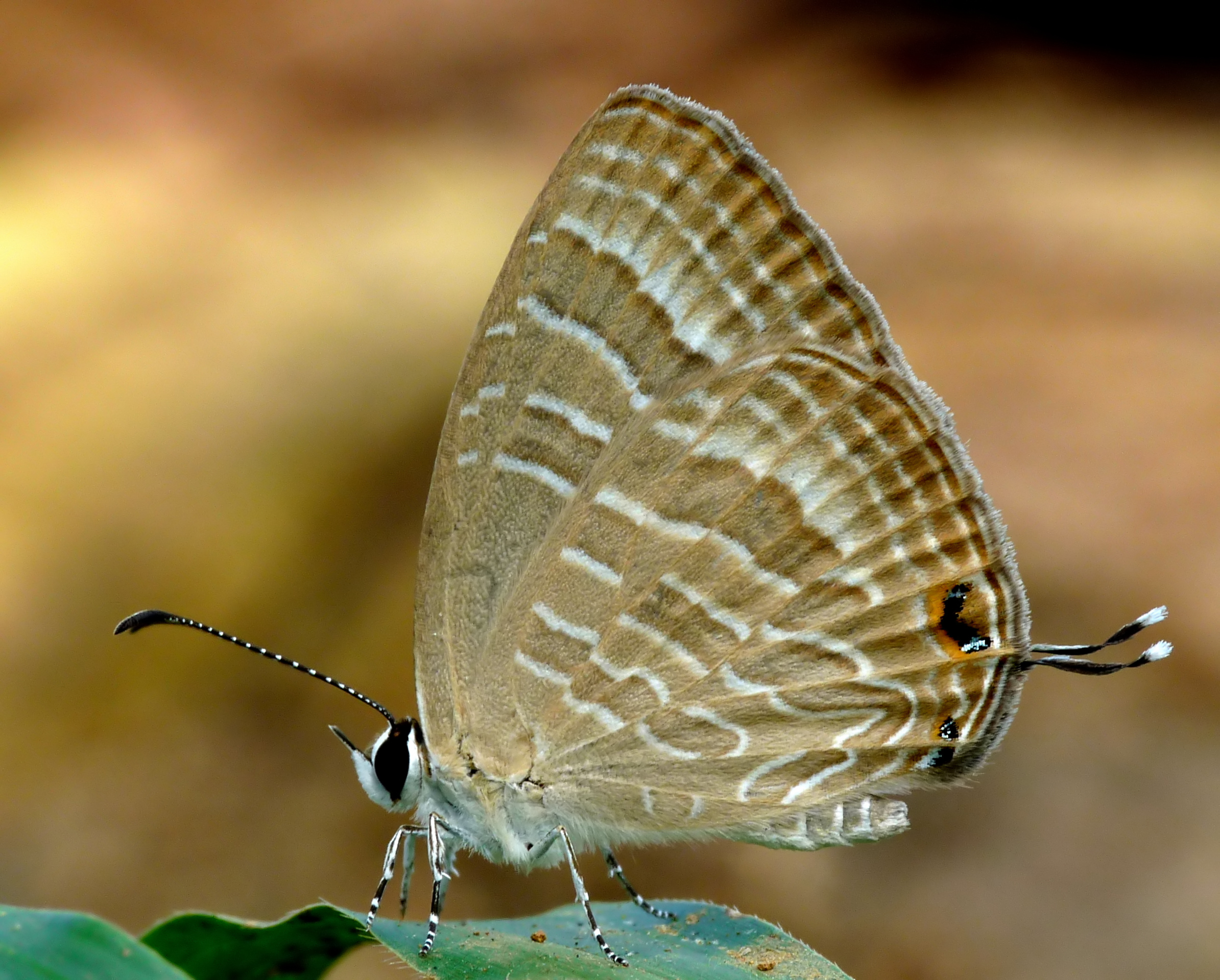
Filamentous tails of a lycaenid butterfly, the common cerulean (Jamides celeno). These tails are thought to confuse a predator as to the location of the head thereby increasing the butterfly's chances of survival.

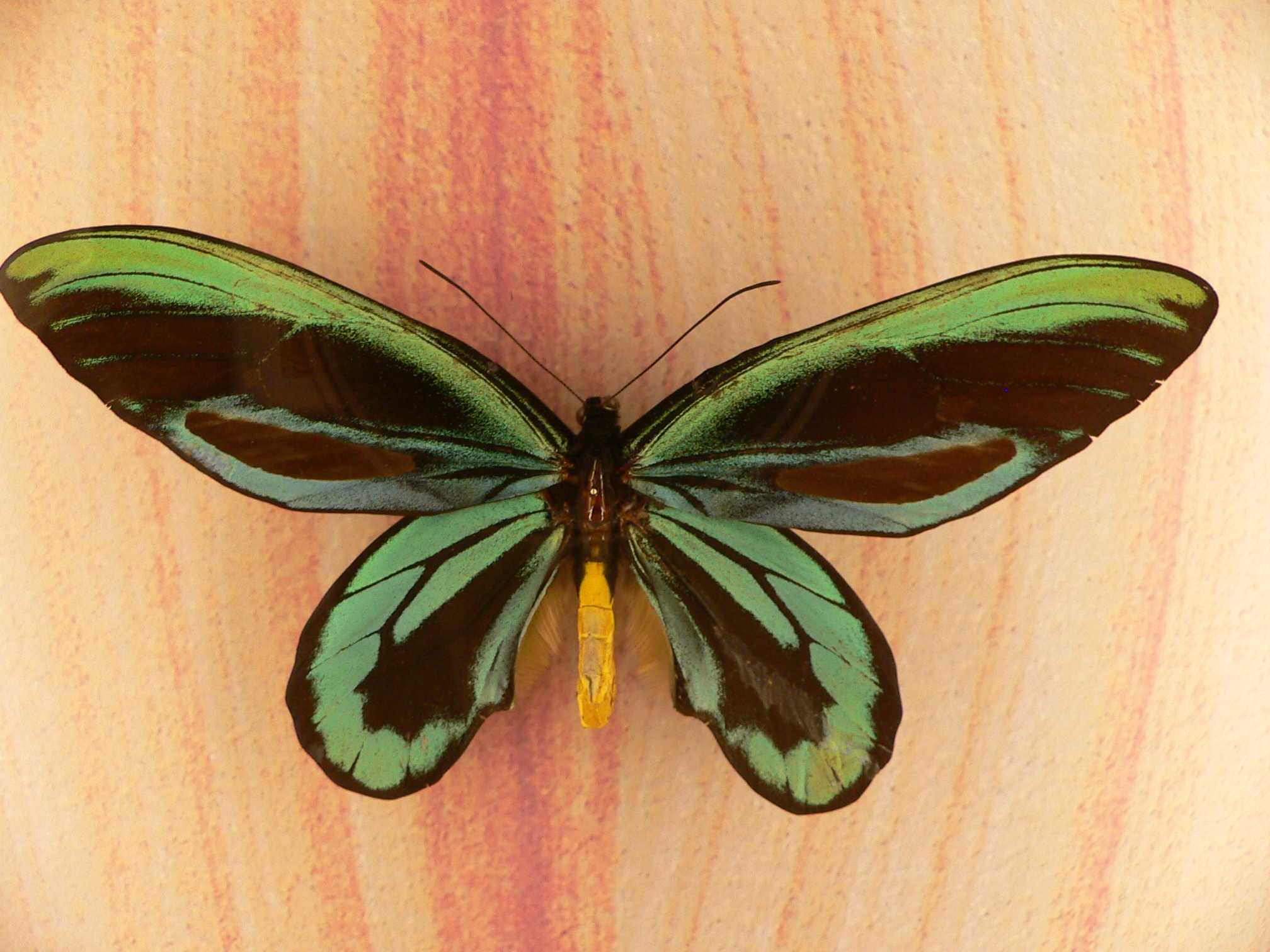
Queen Alexandra's birdwing (Ornithoptera alexandrae family Papilionidae), the largest butterfly in the world, has bright colours and distinctive markings which advertise its inedibility.

Lepidopterans are soft bodied, fragile, and almost defenseless while the immature stages move slowly or are immobile, hence all stages are exposed to predation by birds, small mammals, lizards, amphibians, invertebrate predators (notably parasitoid and parasitic wasps and flies) as well as fungi and bacteria. To combat this, Lepidoptera have developed a number of strategies for defense and protection which include camouflage, aposematism, mimicry, and the development of threat patterns and displays.

Camouflage is an important defense strategy enabled by changes in body shape, colour, and markings. Some lepidopterans blend with the surroundings, making them difficult to be seen by predators. Caterpillars can be shades of green that match their host plant. Others resemble inedible objects, such as twigs or leaves. The larvae of some species, such as the common Mormon and the western tiger swallowtail look like bird droppings.

Some species of Lepidoptera sequester or manufacture toxins which are stored in their body tissue, rendering them poisonous to predators; examples include the monarch butterfly in the Americas and Atrophaneura species in Asia. Predators that eat poisonous lepidopterans may become sick and vomit violently, and so learn to avoid those species. A predator who has previously eaten a poisonous lepidopteran may avoid other species with similar markings in the future, thus saving many other species as well. Toxic butterflies and larvae tend to develop bright colours and striking patterns as an indicator to predators about their toxicity. This phenomenon is known as aposematism.

Aposematism has also led to the development of mimicry complexes of Batesian mimicry, where edible species mimic aposematic taxa, and Müllerian mimicry, where inedible species, often of related taxa, have evolved to resemble each other, so as to benefit from reduced sampling rates by predators during learning. Similarly, adult Sesiidae species (also known as clearwing moths) have a general appearance that is sufficiently similar to a wasp or hornet to make it likely that the moths gain a reduction in predation by Batesian mimicry.

Eyespots are a type of automimicry used by some lepidopterans. In butterflies, the spots are composed of concentric rings of scales of different colours. The proposed role of the eyespots is to deflect predators' attention. Their resemblance to eyes provokes the predator's instinct to attack these wing patterns. The role of filamentous tails in Lycaenidae has been suggested as confusing predators as to the real location of the head, giving them a better chance of escaping alive and relatively unscathed.

Some caterpillars, especially members of Papilionidae, contain an osmeterium, a Y-shaped protrusible gland found in the prothoracic segment of the larvae. When threatened, the caterpillar emits unpleasant smells from the organ to ward off the predators.

== See also ==
- Differences between butterflies and moths
- Glossary of entomology terms
- Insect morphology
- Lepidoptera
- Morphology (biology)
