= Macrosoma albimacula =

Scientific classification
- Domain: Eukaryota
- Kingdom: Animalia
- Phylum: Arthropoda
- Class: Insecta
- Order: Lepidoptera
- Family: Hedylidae
- Genus: Macrosoma
- Species: M. albimacula

Binomial name
- Macrosoma albimacula (Warren, 1900)

Synonyms
- Hyphedyle albimacula Warren, 1900

Species of butterfly

Macrosoma albimacula is moth-like butterfly described by William Warren in 1900. It belongs to the family Hedylidae. Originally it belonged to the genus Hyphedyle.

== Distribution ==
The species is found in the west and north of Ecuador (Paramba of Imbabura Province) and central Peru at altitudes up to 1,630 m.

== Description ==
=== Male ===
==== Wings ====
Male M. albimacula specimens have wings of a greyish brown colour. The forewing has a dark and hardly excavated apex. The costa, the leading edge of the wing is pale in color. There is a prominent white patch at the distal end of the cell with a minute white blip towards the costa.
The length of the forewing is 19–20 mm.

==== Genitalia ====
Following are the characteristics of the genitalia:

- Gnathos is broad and denticulate, with medial tongue-shaped lobe which is very short, weakly sclerotized and not down curved.
- Valva is subtriangular.

==== Antenna ====
The antenna is not bipectinate.

== Diagnosis ==
The wing colour is most similar to that of M. subornata but the discrete costal marking of that species is absent from M. albimacula. The genitalia are very similar to those of M. leucophasiata and M. amaculata although the shape of the valva differs, but the differences in wing markings of the species are pronounced.
