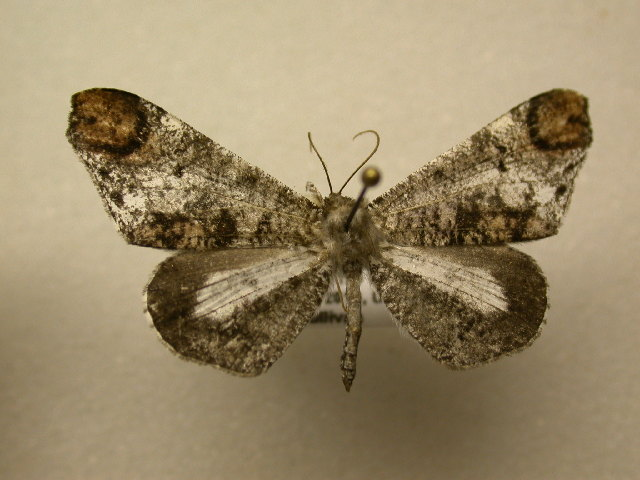

Scientific classification
- Domain: Eukaryota
- Kingdom: Animalia
- Phylum: Arthropoda
- Class: Insecta
- Order: Lepidoptera
- Family: Hedylidae
- Genus: Macrosoma
- Species: M. intermedia

Binomial name
- Macrosoma intermedia (Dognin, 1911)

Synonyms
- Phellinodes biapicata Prout, 1917; Phellinodes gratiosa Schaus, 1912

= Macrosoma intermedia =

Species of butterfly

Macrosoma intermedia is moth-like butterfly described by Paul Dognin in 1911. It belongs to the Hedylidae family. Originally, it was in the genus Phellinodes.

== Distribution ==
The species is recorded from Costa Rica, San Antonio, Colombia, Rio Ucayali in eastern Peru.

== Description ==
=== Wings ===
Adult male has greyish brown ground colour wings. Weakly excavated apex of the forewing is of pale brown color and is bordered by brownish black color. Distal is 1/3 darker than rest of the wing. The hindwing is semi-translucent medially, with broad dark border. Forewing length is 18–20 mm.

=== Genitalia ===
In males, the saccus is short, the gnathos broadly fused with the central component and weakly denticulated laterally and the valva subtriangular.

=== Antenna ===
The antennae of adult males are not bipectinate.

== Diagnosis ==
Macrosoma intermedia is distinguished from M. cascaria by the presence of semitranslucent areas on the wings and the absence of the white triangular mark on the costa of the forewing. This species is distinguished from M. paularia by the less extensive semitranslucent area on the hindwing. The valva of M. intermedia is narrower at the base than in M. cascaria.
