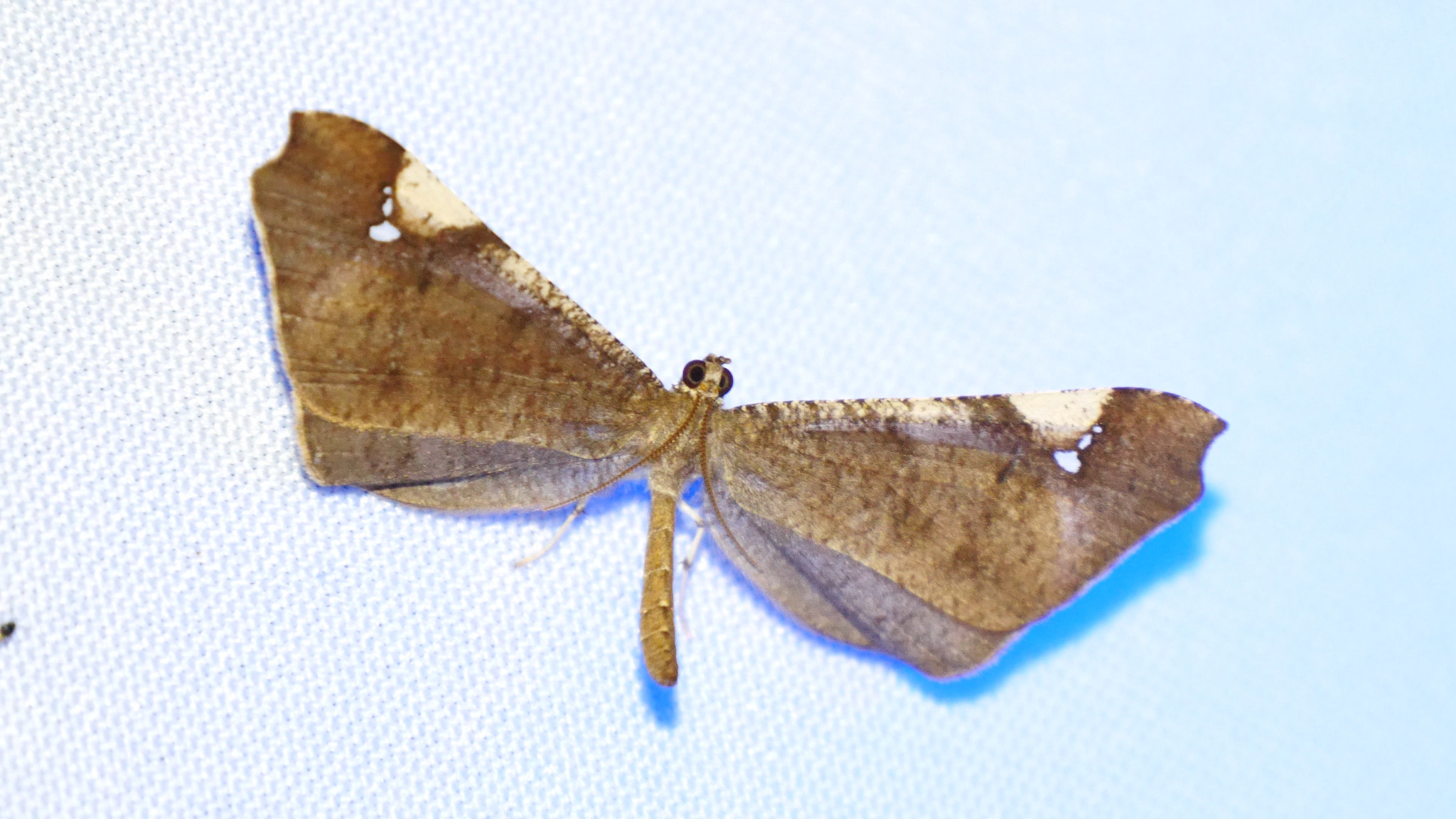

Scientific classification
- Domain: Eukaryota
- Kingdom: Animalia
- Phylum: Arthropoda
- Class: Insecta
- Order: Lepidoptera
- Family: Hedylidae
- Genus: Macrosoma
- Species: M. costilunata

Binomial name
- Macrosoma costilunata (Prout, 1916)

Synonyms
- Phellinodes costilunata Prout, 1916

= Macrosoma costilunata =

Species of butterfly

Macrosoma costilunata is species of moth-like butterfly in the family Hedylidae. It was first described by Louis Beethoven Prout in 1916 and originally classified in the genus Phellinodes.

== Distribution ==
The species is found in north-western Costa Rica and northern and central Ecuador.

== Description ==
=== Wings ===
The wings are grayish brown ground color. Forewing is weakly emarginate with dark brown apex. The costa is postmedial with lunate off-white patch. Three small white marks can be found near the apex.
The length of the forewing is 21–22 mm.

=== Genitalia ===
==== Male ====
Following are the characteristics of the male genitalia:

- Saccus is very short.
- Uncus is apically pointed and is not extending to apex of valva.
- The central element of Gnathos is spinose, downcurved and the lateral components denticulate.
- Valva is narrow, subtriangular and the apex neither upcurved nor upturned.

==== Female ====
The female genitalia has the following features:

- Anal papillae is rounded at apices.
- Signum is denticulate.
- Corpus bursae get widens gradually from ductus.

=== Antenna ===
The antenna is not bipectinate in both sexes.

== Diagnosis ==
The single lunate patch on the costa permits this species to be distinguished from M. satellitiata and its relatives. The female of M. costilunata lacks the large white patch of the female of M. nigrimacula.
