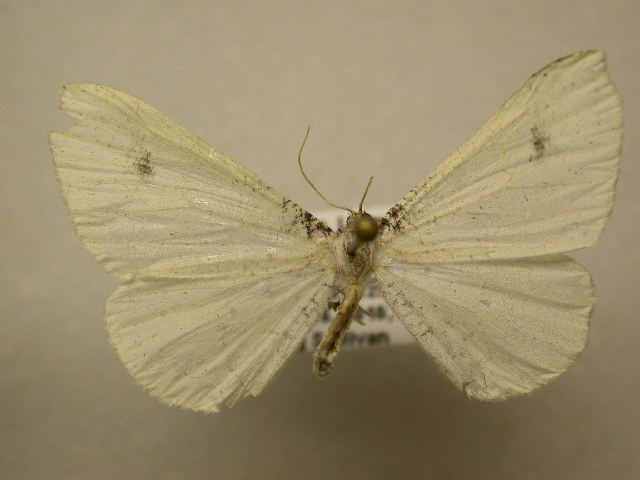

Scientific classification
- Domain: Eukaryota
- Kingdom: Animalia
- Phylum: Arthropoda
- Class: Insecta
- Order: Lepidoptera
- Family: Hedylidae
- Genus: Macrosoma
- Species: M. albida

Binomial name
- Macrosoma albida (Schaus, 1901)

Synonyms
- Hyphedyle albida Schaus, 1901

= Macrosoma albida =

Species of butterfly

Macrosoma albida is moth-like butterfly described by William Schaus in 1901. It belongs to the family Hedylidae. Originally it belonged to the genus Hyphedyle.

== Distribution ==
The species is found in Costa Rica, at altitudes between 0 and 700 meters in the Cordillera de Guanacaste as well as in Rio de Janeiro, eastern and southern Brazil.

== Description ==
=== Wings ===
Adults has white wings with a black spot; the forewing has black irrorations on both surfaces at base of costa.
The length of the forewing can be 17–22 mm:

- Male: 17.5 mm in average.
- Female: 19 mm in average.

=== Genitalia ===
==== Male ====
Following are the characteristics of the male genitalia:

- The medial component of gnathos is tongue-shaped but not down curved.
- Broadly terminating denticulate lateral components.
- Valva is subrectangular with digit-like projection.

==== Female ====
The female genitalia is same as M. rubedinaria shows the following features:

- The anal papillae is more pointed than rounded.
- Long ductus bursae.
- Denticulate signum in the corpus bursae.

=== Antenna ===
The antenna of M. albida is not bipectinate.

== Diagnosis ==
The wing pattern is distinct. Whereas in M. ustrinaria the wings bear scattered irrorations, in M. albida the irrorations are confined to the base of the costa of the forewing. The male genitalia are similar to those of M. ustrinaria, but differ slightly in the shape of the valva.
