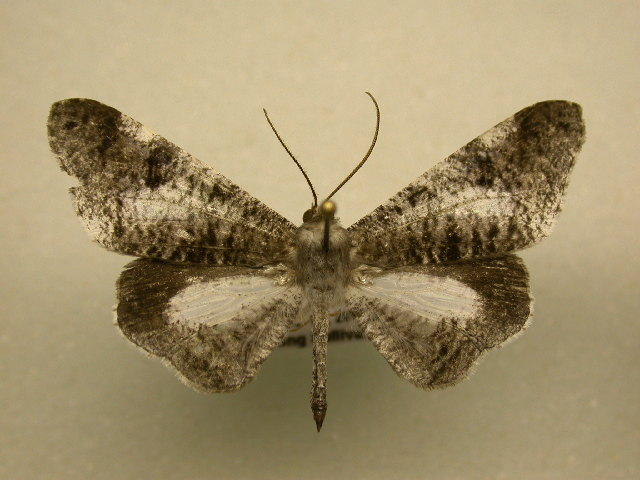

Scientific classification
- Kingdom: Animalia
- Phylum: Arthropoda
- Clade: Pancrustacea
- Class: Insecta
- Order: Lepidoptera
- Family: Hedylidae
- Genus: Macrosoma
- Species: M. conifera

Binomial name
- Macrosoma conifera (Warren, 1897)

Synonyms
- Phellinodes conifera Warren, 1897; Phellinodes conifera gorgonensis Prout, 1932; Phellinodes latiplex Dognin, 1911; Phellinodes zikani Prout, 1932

= Macrosoma conifera =

Species of butterfly

Macrosoma conifera is moth-like butterfly described by Warren in 1897. It belongs to the family Hedylidae. Originally it belonged to the genus Phellinodes. Malcolm J. Scoble combined it with Macrosoma in 1986.

== Distribution ==
The species is found extensively in Guatemala, north of Paraguay: Villarrica, Gorgona Island off the coast of Colombia, Cusco in the Peruvian Andes to eastern Brazil, Amazonas region of Venezuela, the island of Trinidad, Suriname, French Guiana, and Belém at the mouth of the Amazon in northeastern Brazil.

== Description ==
=== Wings ===
M. conifera has wings of the greyish brown ground colour.
Forewing: The forewing has weak medial, semi-translucent area. The triangular white patch on costa is usually prominent, sometimes reduced. The apex is of dark grey-brown colour.
Hindwing: The termen is sometimes weakly sinuate, sometimes rounded; medially semi-translucent with darkish grey-brown colour.
The length of the forewing is 21–26 millimetres (0.83–1.02 in).

=== Genitalia ===
==== Male ====
Following are the characteristics of the male genitalia:

- Saccus is long.
- Uncus extends to level of apex of valva.
- The medial element of Gnathos is not downcurved.
- Valva is subtriangular and the apex is not pointed.

==== Female ====
The female genitalia has the following features:

- Anal papillae is pointed.
- Sternum has a sclerotized pocket on either side of the ostium bursae.
- Corpus bursae is elongated and broadening gradually from ductus.
- Signum is either denticulate or absent.

=== Antenna ===
The antenna is not bipectinate in both sexes.

== Diagnosis ==
The absence of chestnut brown on the wings of M. conifera distinguishes the species from M. hedylaria and M. cascaria. M. conifera is also similar in wing pattern to M. semiermis and its relatives, but in M. conifera the antenna is filiform not bipectinate.
