= Macrosoma albipannosa =

Scientific classification
- Domain: Eukaryota
- Kingdom: Animalia
- Phylum: Arthropoda
- Class: Insecta
- Order: Lepidoptera
- Family: Hedylidae
- Genus: Macrosoma
- Species: M. albipannosa

Binomial name
- Macrosoma albipannosa (Prout, 1916)

Synonyms
- Hedyle albipannosa Prout, 1916

Species of butterfly

Macrosoma albipannosa is moth-like butterfly described by Louis Beethoven Prout in 1916. It belongs to the family Hedylidae. Originally it belonged to the genus Hedyle. Malcolm J. Scoble combined it with Macrosoma in 1986.

== Distribution ==
The species is found in the Peruvian Andes at altitudes up to 10,000 feet, Cerro de Pasco, Huancabamba. There is one record from Intas, Ecuador.

== Description ==
=== Wings ===
The wings are dark greyish brown in colour with translucent areas on both forewing and hindwing. The forewing has a deep triangular white mark on the costa, and the apex is more brown than grey-brown.
The length of the forewing is 23–25 mm.

=== Genitalia ===
==== Male ====
Following are the characteristics of the male genitalia:

- The uncus is appearing notched in the lateral view.
- Gnathos with lateral members broadening at apex.
- Valva slightly sinuate, narrowing to almost pointed apex and without inner lobe.

==== Female ====
The female genitalia is similar to M. semiermis, which has the following features:

- The anal papillae is more rounded (in M. semiermis it is pointed).
- Bursa Copulatrix.
- Corpus is elongated and signum absent.

=== Antenna ===
The antenna is bipectinate in both sexes.

== Diagnosis ==
It is similar to M. heliconiaria and M. semiermis but larger and darker than both. The white triangular mark on the forewing costa penetrates deeper into the wing. The shapes of the uncus and valva are diagnostic: in the female, the anal papillae are more rounded than in either M. heliconiaria or M. semiermis. Unlike the arrangement in M. heliconiaria the corpus bursae is not globose, and the signum is absent.
