= Macrosoma coscoja =

Scientific classification
- Domain: Eukaryota
- Kingdom: Animalia
- Phylum: Arthropoda
- Class: Insecta
- Order: Lepidoptera
- Family: Hedylidae
- Genus: Macrosoma
- Species: M. coscoja

Binomial name
- Macrosoma coscoja (Dognin, 1900)

Synonyms
- Phellinodes coscoja Dognin, 1900

Species of butterfly

Macrosoma coscoja is moth-like butterfly described by Paul Dognin in 1900. It belongs to the family Hedylidae. Originally it belonged to the genus Phellinodes. Malcolm J. Scoble combined it with Macrosoma in 1986.

== Distribution ==
The species is found in eastern Colombia, eastern central and south Ecuador, central to southeastern Peru to eastern Bolivia.

== Description ==
=== Wings ===
M. coscoja has wings of the grey-brown ground colour. The apex of the forewing is weakly emarginate and dark brown in colour. Small white mark(s) either is present or entirely absent at the proximal edge of dark apical patch. Postmedially, a narrow white streak edged with brown is found on the inner side. Unlikely the female, the male of this species are lacks with small glassy patch at base of hindwing.
The length of the forewing is 18–20 mm.

=== Genitalia ===
==== Male ====
Following are the characteristics of the male genitalia:

- Saccus is fairly short.
- Gnathos with the medial component is tongue-shaped, downcurved and without denticles.
- Lateral angles is with denticles.
- Valva is broad medially, narrows to finger-like projection.

==== Female ====
The female genitalia has the following features:

- Anal papillae is fairly pointed.
- Ductus bursae broadens gradually into corpus bursae.
- Signum is denticulate.

=== Antenna ===
The antenna is not bipectinate in both sexes.

== Diagnosis ==
M. coscoja is similar to M. albistria, M. bahiata, M. uniformis, and M. amaculata. The presence of the narrow postmedial streak distinguishes M. coscoja from these species, as does the shape of the Gnathos and Valva.
