= Macrosoma hedylaria =

Scientific classification
- Domain: Eukaryota
- Kingdom: Animalia
- Phylum: Arthropoda
- Class: Insecta
- Order: Lepidoptera
- Family: Hedylidae
- Genus: Macrosoma
- Species: M. hedylaria

Binomial name
- Macrosoma hedylaria (Warren, 1894)

Synonyms
- Phellinodes hedylaria Warren, 1894

Species of butterfly

Macrosoma hedylaria is moth-like butterfly described by William Warren in 1894. It belongs to the family Hedylidae. Originally it belonged to the genus Phellinodes. Malcolm J. Scoble combined it with Macrosoma in 1986.

== Distribution ==
The species is found Eastern Colombia, the Amazonas area of Venezuela, across Brazil from the northwest to the northeast and south to below São Paulo in the east of that country. Peru, on either side of the Andes down to Lima in the west.

== Description ==
=== Wings ===
The wings are greyish-brown color with white and black markings. Forewing is medially semi-translucent with prominent triangular white patch on costa. The apex is of pale chestnut color. Hindwing medially semi-translucent with dark grey-brown broder. The semi-translucent area of the hindwing has dark, poorly defined spot beneath it.
The length of the forewing is 22–27 mm.

=== Genitalia ===
==== Male ====
Following are the characteristics of the male genitalia:

- Uncus is truncated at apex (ventral view), extending beyond apex of the Valva.
- The central element of Gnathos is small and short, not downcurved.
- The apex of Valva is upcurved (i.e., dorsally).
- Diaphragma densely denticulate.

==== Female ====
The female genitalia has the following features:

- Anal papillae is more rounded than pointed.
- Anterior apophyses is weakly sclerotized.
- Pocket present on Sternum 7 on each side of ostium bursae.

=== Antenna ===
The antenna is not bipectinate in both sexes.

== Diagnosis ==
M. hedylaria can be distinguished from M. cascaria by the presence of extensive semi-translucent areas on the wings and the prominent white triangular mark on the forewing. The pale chestnut brown color of the apex helps to distinguish M. hedylaria from M. conifera.
