= Macrosoma klagesi =

Scientific classification
- Domain: Eukaryota
- Kingdom: Animalia
- Phylum: Arthropoda
- Class: Insecta
- Order: Lepidoptera
- Family: Hedylidae
- Genus: Macrosoma
- Species: M. klagesi

Binomial name
- Macrosoma klagesi (Prout, 1916)

Synonyms
- Phellinodes klagesi Prout, 1916

Species of butterfly

Macrosoma klagesi is moth-like butterfly described by Louis Beethoven Prout in 1916. It belongs to the family Hedylidae. Originally it belonged to the genus Phellinodes. Malcolm J. Scoble combined it with Macrosoma in 1986.

== Distribution ==
The species is recorded from Fonte Boa, Brazil.

== Description ==
=== Wings ===
The wings of adult male are similar to M. nigrimacula having the forewings with dark mark below apex less prominent. Length of the forewing: 26 mm.

=== Genitalia ===
Following are the characteristics of the male genitalia:

- Saccus is short.
- The medial component of gnathos is not downcurved.
- Valva is subtriangular with pointed apex.

== Diagnosis ==
The M. klagesi differs from M. nigrimacula by the less prominent dark mark below the apex of the forewing. The male genitalia of M. klagesi differs from those of M. nigrimacula by the shorter saccus, the shape of the gnathos, and the more triangular valva.
