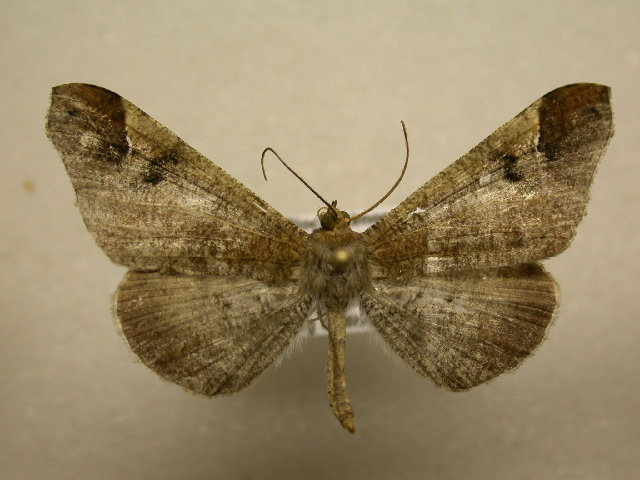

Scientific classification
- Domain: Eukaryota
- Kingdom: Animalia
- Phylum: Arthropoda
- Class: Insecta
- Order: Lepidoptera
- Family: Hedylidae
- Genus: Macrosoma
- Species: M. bahiata

Binomial name
- Macrosoma bahiata (Felder & Rogenhofer, 1875)

Synonyms
- Phellinodes bahiata Felder & Rogenhofer, 1875

= Macrosoma bahiata =

Species of butterfly

Macrosoma bahiata is a moth-like butterfly species described by Cajetan von Felder and Alois Friedrich Rogenhofer in 1875. It belongs to the family Hedylidae. Originally it belonged to the genus Phellinodes. Malcolm J. Scoble combined it with Macrosoma in 1986.

== Distribution ==
The species is found in East Mexico, Quintana Roo Territory through Central America to Lima, Peru. East to Belém, Bahia, Brazil at the mouth of the Amazon.

== Description ==
=== Wings ===
M. bahiata has wings of greyish brown ground colour. The apex of the forewing is dark brown and very weakly emarginate. Small white marks are usually merged at proximal edge of dark apical patch. And prominent, dark, postmedial spot towards middle of wing is found.
The length of the forewing is 19–24 mm.

=== Genitalia ===
==== Male ====
Following are the characteristics of the male genitalia:

- The medial component of Gnathos is lateral not downcurved nor denticulate.
- Valva is subtriangular, broad at base.

==== Female ====
The female genitalia has the following features:

- Anal papillae is relatively long.
- Ductus bursae broadens suddenly into Corpus bursae.
- Signum is denticulate.

=== Antenna ===
The antenna is not bipectinate in both sexes.

== Diagnosis ==
The prominent postmedial spot on the forewing enables M. bahiata to be get distinguished from M. uniformis, M. albistria, and M. coscoja, the species to which it looks most similar. The shape of the Gnathos is a usefully a distinguishing feature.
