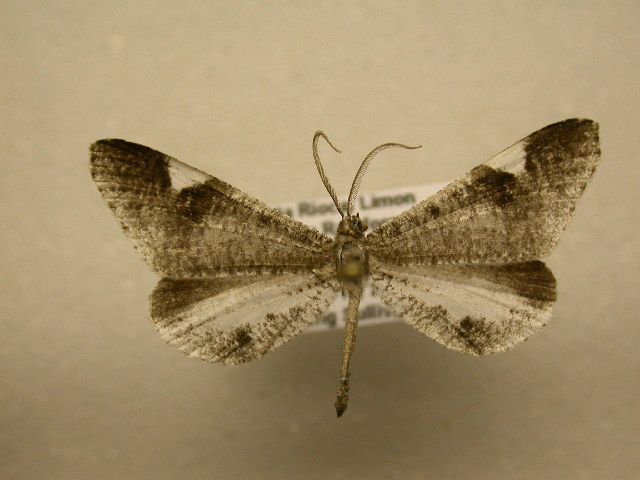

Scientific classification
- Domain: Eukaryota
- Kingdom: Animalia
- Phylum: Arthropoda
- Class: Insecta
- Order: Lepidoptera
- Family: Hedylidae
- Genus: Macrosoma
- Species: M. heliconiaria

Binomial name
- Macrosoma heliconiaria (Guenée, 1857)

Synonyms
- Hedyle heliconiaria Guenée, 1857; Hedyle heliconaria Walker, 1862

= Macrosoma heliconiaria =

Species of butterfly

Macrosoma heliconiaria is moth-like butterfly described by Achille Guenée in 1857. It belongs to the family Hedylidae. Originally it belonged to the genus Hedyle. Malcolm J. Scoble combined it with Macrosoma in 1986. The species displays characteristics of both moths and butterflies and is believed to be the closest living ancestor to modern butterflies. Adaptions to avoid bat predation have given the species ultrasonic hearing and night vision through superposition optics.

== Distribution ==
The species is recorded widely across the tropical South America: Colombia, Venezuela, French Guiana, across Brazil to Belém at the mouth of the Amazon; south to the mid-west of Peru.

== Description ==
=== Wings ===
The wings are greyish brown in color. Forewing has white triangle on the costa. Hindwing is narrow translucent in the central area. The length of forewing can be 17–19 mm.

=== Genitalia ===
==== Male ====
Following are the characteristics of the male genitalia:

- Uncus is not notched in lateral view.
- Gnathos has short, truncated lateral members.
- The apex of the Valva is narrow with prominent inner lobe.

==== Female ====
The female genitalia has the following features:

- The anal papillae is pointed.
- Corpus bursae is globose;
- Signum is a form of sclerotized, denticulate collar half encircling the neck of the corpus.

=== Antenna ===
The antenna is bipectinate in both sexes.

== Diagnosis ==
M. heliconiaria is similar to M. semiermis, but the translucent area on the hindwing is less extensive, the ground color of the moth is more grey, and the apex of the forewing is not distinctly darker than the rest of the wing in terms of intensity. The shape of the gnathos and the presence of the lobe on the valva also distinguishes M. heliconiaria from M. semiermis, as does the globose corpus bursae with its collar like signum.

== Sources ==
Yack, J. E., Johnson, S. E., Brown, S. G., & Warrant, E. J. (2007). The eyes of Macrosoma sp. (Lepidoptera: Hedyloidea): A nocturnal butterfly with superposition optics. Arthropod Structure & Development, 36(1), 11–22. https://doi.org/10.1016/j.asd.2006.07.001

Yack, J. E., & Fullard, J. H. (2000). Ultrasonic hearing in nocturnal butterflies. Nature (London), 403(6767), 265–266. https://doi.org/10.1038/35002247

Yack, J. E., Kalko, E. K. V., & Surlykke, A. (2007). Neuroethology of ultrasonic hearing in nocturnal butterflies (Hedyloidea). Journal of Comparative Physiology A, 193(6), 577–590. https://doi.org/10.1007/s00359-007-0213-2
