= Macrosoma albifascia =

Scientific classification
- Domain: Eukaryota
- Kingdom: Animalia
- Phylum: Arthropoda
- Class: Insecta
- Order: Lepidoptera
- Family: Hedylidae
- Genus: Macrosoma
- Species: M. albifascia

Binomial name
- Macrosoma albifascia (Warren, 1904)

Synonyms
- Phellinodes albifascia expedita Prout, 1932

Species of butterfly

Macrosoma albifascia is moth-like butterfly described by William Warren in 1904. It belongs to the family Hedylidae. Originally it belonged to the genus Phellinodes. A subspecies with the name M. albifascia albifascia was defined by Warren. Another subspecies M. albifascia expedita was proposed by Louis Beethoven Prout in 1932.

== Distribution ==
The species is found in the eastern Andes of South America (Ecuador, Peru, Bolivia). The type locality is Carabaya, Santo Domingo, south-eastern Peru.

== Description ==
=== Male ===
==== Wings ====
Male M. albifascia has wings of greyish brown ground colour. The apex or the anterior corner of the forewing is dark brown with white band stretching across the wing with prominent dark streak. The termen can have either poorly defined white triangular mark or without white mark, but two dark spot.
The length of the forewing is 23–25 mm.

==== Genitalia ====
Following are the characteristics of the genitalia:

- Short saccus.
- Gnathos with central element downcurved.
- Valva is subtriangular.

==== Antenna ====
The antenna is not bipectinate.

== Diagnosis ==
The male genitalia of M. albifascia are similar to those of M. cascaria, the wing pattern is quite different, and the shape of the valva differs.
