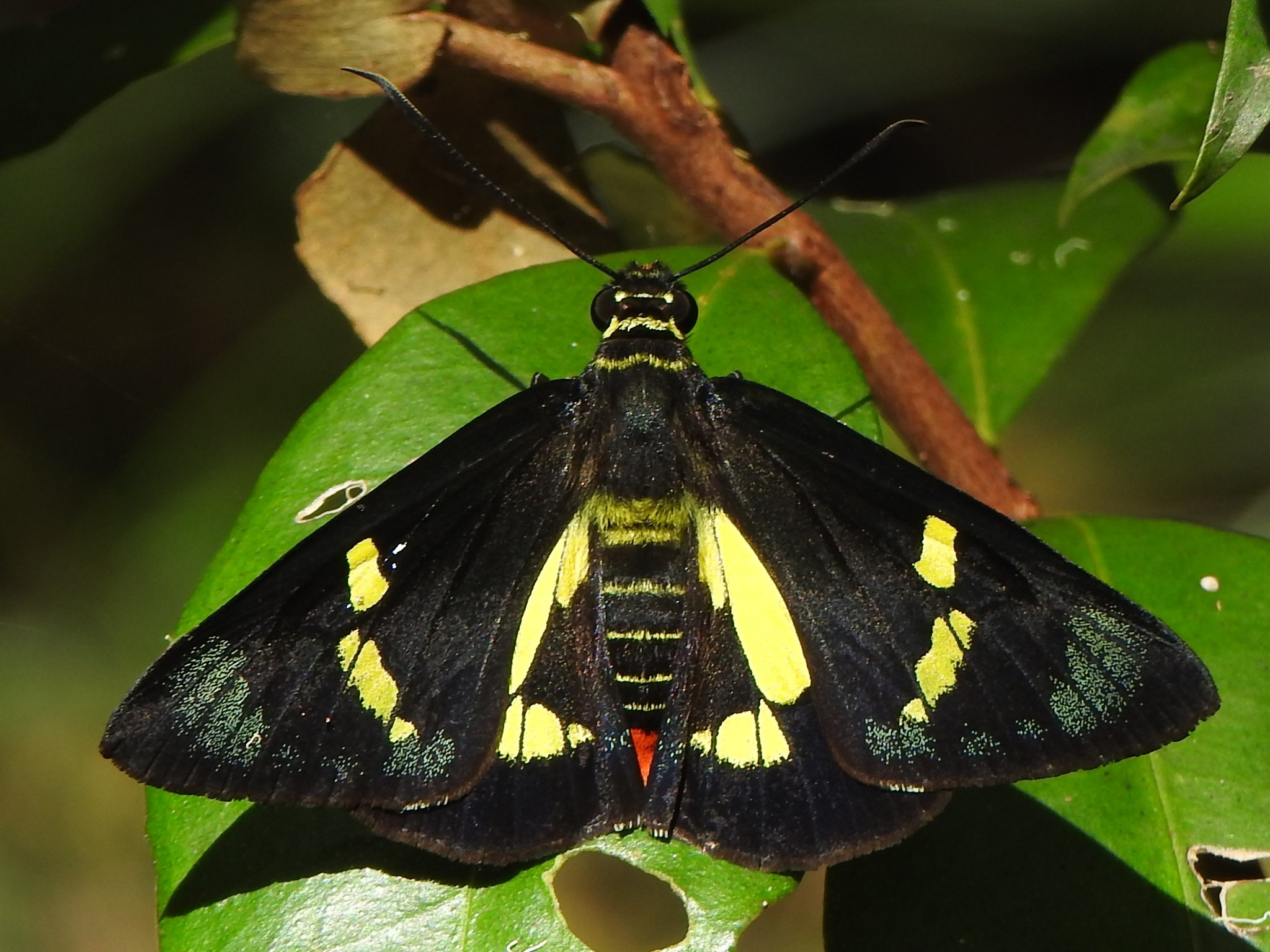

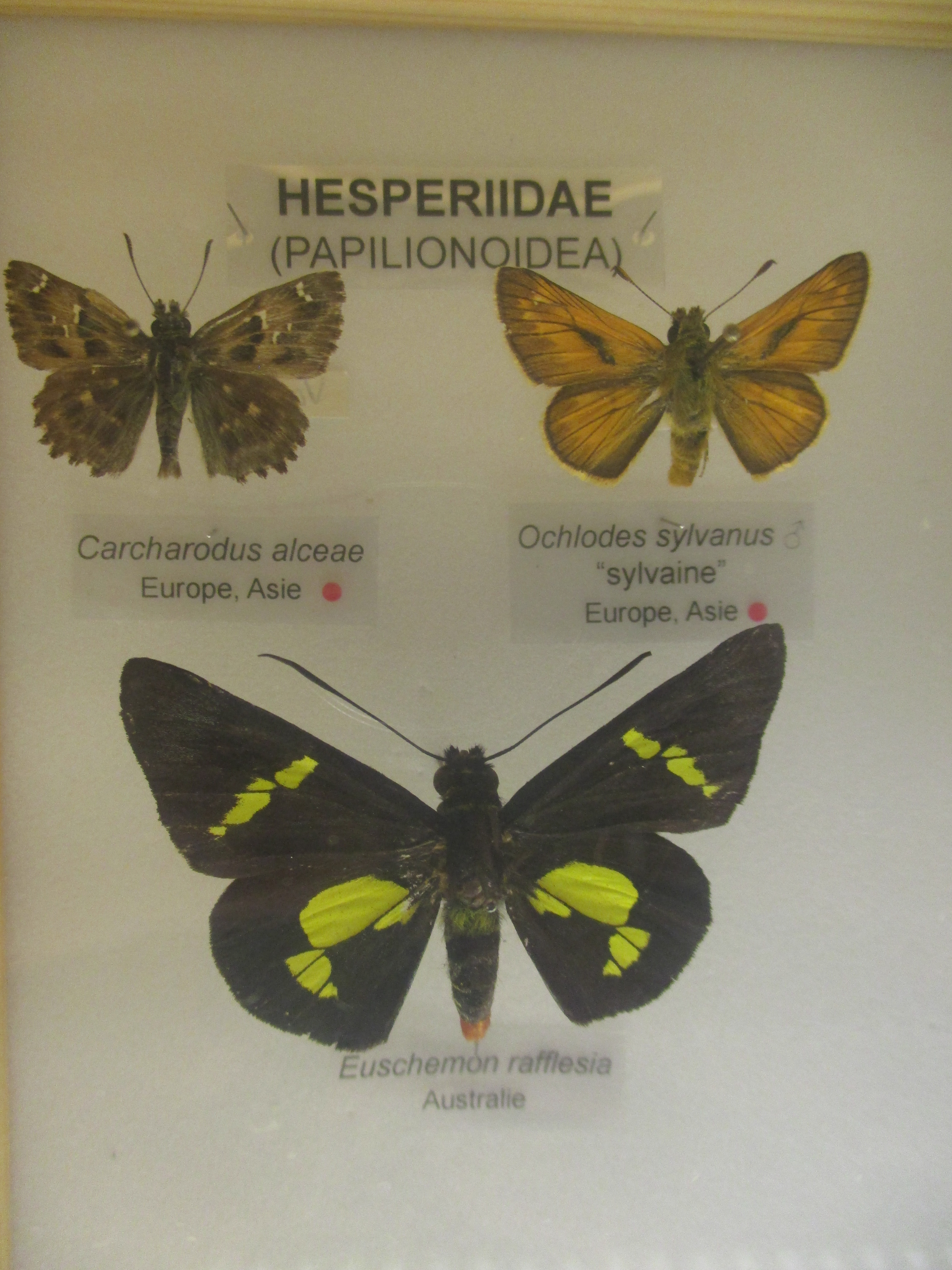

Scientific classification
- Kingdom: Animalia
- Phylum: Arthropoda
- Clade: Pancrustacea
- Class: Insecta
- Order: Lepidoptera
- Family: Hesperiidae
- Subfamily: Euschemoninae; Kirby, 1897
- Genus: Euschemon; Doubleday, 1846
- Species: E. rafflesia

Binomial name
- Euschemon rafflesia (Macleay, [1827])

Synonyms
- Several, see text

= Euschemon =

Regent skipper

Genus of butterflies

Euschemon is a genus of skipper butterflies in the family Hesperiidae. It is monotypic, being represented by the single species Euschemon rafflesia, commonly known as the regent skipper and is found in Australia.

== Taxonomy ==
It was formerly often included in the tribe Tagiadini of the subfamily of spread-winged skippers, Pyrginae. However, it seems to be the single most distinct living skipper butterfly. Consequently, it is treated as a monotypic subfamily Euschemoninae, as was first proposed by William Forsell Kirby as early as 1897.

=== Synonyms ===
The regent skipper, in addition to the systematic uncertainties that have surrounded it for long, is a rather variable species. Consequently, it has been treated under a variety of names, which are nowadays considered junior synonyms. For example:

- Euschemon alba Mabille, [1903]
- Euschemon alboornatus Olliff, 1891
- Euschemon viridis Waterhouse, 1932
- Exometoeca rafflesia (Macleay, [1827])
- Hesperia rafflesia Macleay, [1827]

William Sharp Macleay named the butterfly after Sir Stamford Raffles "to whose scientific ardour and indefatigable exertions in Java and Sumatra, every naturalist must feel himself indebted."

== Description ==
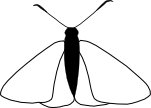
Typical resting position

The regent skipper is quite small relative to most butterflies, however, it is large relative to most species in the family Hesperiidae. Its common name refers to the gaudy coloration; mostly black with conspicuous yellow and red dots and bands.

A notable trait of this butterfly are the males' frenulum and retinaculum which couple the fore- and hindwing together in flight. This structure is presumably plesiomorphic for most or all Macrolepidoptera, but is absent in all known Rhopalocera (butterflies) except the regent skipper and the Hedylidae (moth-butterflies).
