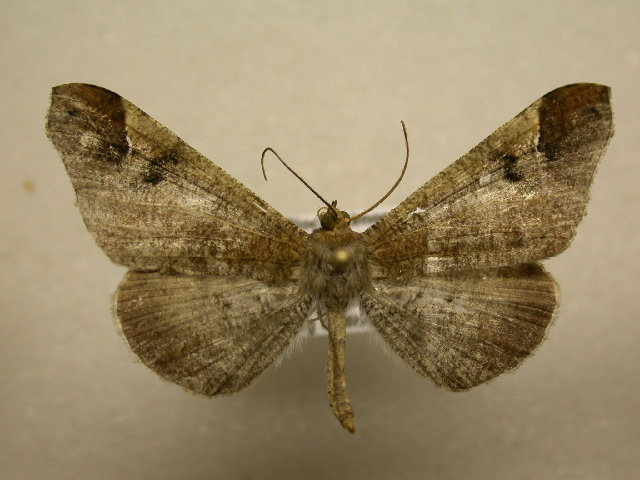
- Macrosoma bahiata

Scientific classification
- Kingdom: Animalia
- Phylum: Arthropoda
- Clade: Pancrustacea
- Class: Insecta
- Order: Lepidoptera
- Clade: Obtectomera
- Superfamily: Papilionoidea
- Family: Hedylidae; Guenée, 1857, nec. Bergh, 1895
- Genus: Macrosoma; Hübner, 1818

Type species
- Macrosoma tipulata Hübner, 1818

Species
- see List of species

Diversity
- 35 currently recognised species

Synonyms
- Epirrita Hübner, 1808 [unavailable name]; Hedyle Guenée, 1857, type species Hedyle heliconiaria Guenée, 1857; Phellinodes Guenée, 1857, type species Phellinodes satellitiata Guenée, 1857; Venodes Guenée, 1857, type species Phellinodes satellitiata Guenée, 1857; Macrophila Walker, 1862, type species Macrosoma tipulata Hübner, 1818; Hyphedyle Warren, 1894, type species Hedyle rubedinaria Walker, 1862; Lasiopates Warren, 1905, type species Lasiopates hyacinthina Warren, 1905

= Hedylidae =

Family of moth-like butterflies

Hedylidae, the "American moth-butterflies", is a family of insects in the order Lepidoptera, formerly representing the superfamily Hedyloidea. They have traditionally been viewed as an extant sister group of the butterfly superfamily Papilionoidea, but a 2014 phylogenetic analysis has suggested Hedylidae is a subgroup of Papilionoidea, and not a sister group, and are more accurately referred to as butterflies rather than moths. They are represented by a single Neotropical genus, Macrosoma, with 35 currently recognized species.

== Taxonomy and systematics ==
Hedylidae were previously treated as a tribe of Geometridae: Oenochrominae, the "Hedylicae". Prout considered they might even merit treatment as their own family. Scoble first considered them to be a hitherto unrecognised group of butterflies and also suggested Hedylidae might possibly constitute the sister group of the "true" butterflies (Papilionoidea), rather than of (Hesperioidea + Papilionoidea). Weintraub and Miller argued against this placement (but see). In 1995, Weller and Pashley found that molecular data did indeed place Hedylidae with the butterflies and a more comprehensive study in 2005 based on 57 exemplar taxa, three genes and 99 morphological characters, recovered the genus Macrosoma as sister to the ("Papilionoidea" + Hesperioidea). However, the most recent phylogenetic analyses shows that skippers are true butterflies and therefore within the clade Papilionoidea, whereas the hedylids are a sister group that may be closely related to the obtectomeran moths. This is contrary to some earlier studies that had shown both the skippers and hedylids as being nested within the Papilionoidea.

Since there are no obvious gaps between supposed species groups, according to basic morphological structure, Scoble (1986) synonymised the five pre-existing genera of Hedylidae (33 of which had been described in Phellinodes) into the single genus Macrosoma. However, a phylogenetic analysis of all Macrosoma species is still needed.

=== Nomenclatural notes ===
In zoological nomenclature, numerous junior homonyms of Macrosoma (Hübner, 1818) exist, (Macrosoma Leach 1819 (a reptile), Macrosoma de Haan 1826 (Odonata), Macrosoma Robineau-Desvoidy 1830 (Diptera: Muscidae), Macrosoma Brandt 1835 (Coelenterata), Macrosoma Hope 1837 (Coleoptera), Macrosoma Lioy 1864 or 1865 (Diptera: Sarcophagidae), Macrosoma Hammer 1979 (Acarina: Oribatidae). To add to this potential confusion in lists of names, there exist two junior homonyms of Hedyle Guenée, 1857: Hedyle Bergh, 1895 (Opisthobranchia, "Acochlidioidea", Hedylopsidae; currently placed in the genus Hedylopsis Thiele, 1931), and Hedyle Malmgren 1865 (a polychaete worm). The sea slug family name "Hedylidae Bergh, 1895" (type species Hedyle weberi Bergh, 1895) is thus also invalid.

== Morphology and identification ==
The eggs of hedylid moths have an upright configuration and are variable in shape: in Macrosoma inermis they are particularly narrow and spindle-shaped, resembling those of some Pieridae, and in the case of M. tipulata they are more barrel-shaped, like certain Nymphalidae. The larvae resemble (probably convergently) those of Apaturinae. Adult hedylids resemble geometer moths. They share many morphological and genetic characteristics with both the superfamilies Papilionoidea and the Hesperioidea. The abdomen is very long and slim, like many Neotropical butterflies of the subfamilies Ithomiinae and Heliconiinae, hence the name of one Macrosoma species "heliconiaria". Unlike other butterflies, however, the antennae are un-clubbed, but rather filiform or bipectinate. Unlike the family Geometridae, in which they had been placed by the geometer expert L.B.Prout, hedylids lack tympanic organs at the base of the abdomen, but have them on the wings (see under Behaviour). Unlike other butterflies, however (except the unique case of the remarkable Australian skipper butterfly Euschemon rafflesia, whose males possess these structures), the single-spined frenulum and retinaculum are not lost or reduced in males, except in three Macrosoma species where there is no functional wing coupling system. The retinaculum is always lost in females, and the frenulum may be vestigial. The family have been fully catalogued and illustrated in an identification guide.

=== Butterfly-like characteristics of Hedylidae ===
1. "Mesoscutum" with "secondary line of weakness" near median "notal" wing process, as in some representatives of Papilionidea and Hesperioidea (potentially unique butterfly character;
2. Mesothoracic aorta with horizontal chamber, as in other butterflies (not Papilionidae), but as also in Cossidae;
3. Metathoracic "furca" resembling a blunt arrowhead; this a variable but potentially unique character in butterflies;
4. Second median plate of forewing base lying partly under the base of vein "1A+2A", unlike the configuration in moths;
5. "Postspiracular bar" on first abdominal segment;
6. Female genitalic "anterior apophyses" reduced;
7. Male genitalia relatively "deep" dorso-ventrally;
8. Abdomen curved (especially in males), as in papilionoids;
9. Abdominal first tergal segment is strongly "pouched" (Scoble 1986; as also in Thyatirinae moths;
10. "Precoxal" sulcus joining "marginopleural" sulcus;
11. Male Foreleg pretarsus lost, thus fused into two elements as in nymphalid butterflies, with the mid and hindlegs used for perching, but apparently redeveloped in hesperiids;
12. Egg upright, spindle-shaped and ribbed as in some Pieridae (e.g. the orange tip butterfly), some other butterflies, and as in some moth groups also;
13. Larva with "anal comb", as in some Hesperioidea (not however Megathyminae) and Pieridae, but not in other Papilionoidea except one species (and also independently in Tortricidae), that is used for propulsion of frass away from the caterpillar;
14. Caterpillar with horn-like processes and a "bifid" tail as in many Nymphalidae;
15. Caterpillar with "secondary setae", as in Pieridae;
16. Ventral larval proleg "crochet" hooks not forming a complete circle, unlike configuration in hesperiids and papilionoids;
17. Pupa affixed to the substrate via a silken girdle around the 1st abdominal segment, like in Pieridae (as also in some Geometridae, especially the subfamily Sterrhinae (in which the girdle is around the abdomen), but lost in many Papilionoidea);
18. Pupal cocoon lost, as in papilionoids, and a few other groups of Lepidoptera;
19. "Temporal cleavage line" lost in the pupa (as in papilionoids).

== Distribution ==
Hedylidae range in North America south from central Mexico and in South America through the Amazon from southern Peru (where there are a full 26 species, up to 12 at a single site: to central Bolivia and southwestern Brazil). In the Caribbean, they also occur in Cuba, Jamaica, and Trinidad.

== Behaviour ==
Hedylids are attracted to artificial lights, but occasionally some species can be found flying by day. Thus, they may be involved in some mimicry complexes with Ithomiinae (e.g. the female only of Macrosoma lucivittata). A few species are white and resemble pierid butterflies (e.g. Macrosoma napiaria). Based on a study of Macrosoma heliconiaria, it has been found that hedylids have tympanic organs on their forewings for hearing apparently homologous to the "Vogel's organ" in some Papilionoidea that would help them evade bats at night. They have been shown to exhibit typical moth evasive behaviour towards bats such as erratic spiralling movements and dives. The resting posture is often at a curious angle, with the thorax tilted and the posterior edge of the hindwings nearly touching the substrate (Scoble, 1986). The larvae which lack the prominent horns in the first instar tend to rest on the midrib of the leaf and often skeletonise leaves or at either side produce an untidy patchwork of holes. The elegant pupa is attached by a cremaster and silken girdle and sometimes resembles a bird dropping.

== List of species ==
This list of species is largely based on phenetic characters.

- Macrosoma albida
- Macrosoma albifascia
- Macrosoma albimacula
- Macrosoma albipannosa
- Macrosoma albistria
- Macrosoma amaculata
- Macrosoma bahiata
- Macrosoma cascaria
- Macrosoma conifera
- Macrosoma coscoja
- Macrosoma costilunata
- Macrosoma hedylaria
- Macrosoma heliconiaria
- Macrosoma hyacinthina
- Macrosoma intermedia
- Macrosoma klagesi
- Macrosoma lamellifera
- Macrosoma leptosiata
- Macrosoma leucophasiata
- Macrosoma leucoplethes
- Macrosoma lucivittata
- Macrosoma minutipuncta
- Macrosoma muscerdata
- Macrosoma napiaria
- Macrosoma nigrimacula
- Macrosoma paularia
- Macrosoma pectinogyna
- Macrosoma rubedinaria
- Macrosoma satellitiata
- Macrosoma semiermis
- Macrosoma stabilinota
- Macrosoma subornata
- Macrosoma tipulata
- Macrosoma uniformis
- Macrosoma ustrinaria

== Biology and host plants ==
The life history of Macrosoma heliconiaria was originally described from plants of Byttneria aculeata in Mexico. This was a historical breakthrough into the biology of hedylids. In this study, Kendall commented notably "I thought the larvae might represent a satyr species, but when the first larva pupated I was sure it was a pierid. The first adult emerged as a complete surprise. The pupa...is secured by girdle and cremaster, not unlike a pierid". Macrosoma cascaria was later also reared on this plant in Panama. More life histories are now known. From these data, known host plants span a wide range of (according to the APG II system) rosid dicotyledonous plants, including the rosid order Myrtales family Melastomataceae (genera Miconia, Conostegia, and Ossaea), the eurosid I order Malpighiales, families Euphorbiaceae (Croton), and Malpighiaceae (Byrsonima), the eurosid II orders Sapindales, family Rutaceae (Zanthoxylum) and more commonly Malvales, family Malvaceae, tribes: Bombacoideae (Ochroma), Malvoideae (Hampea and also Hibiscus, Byttnerioideae (Byttneria aculeata, Theobroma) and Grewioideae (Luehea). The "green lizard caterpillar" Macrosoma tipulata attacks an economically important local fruit tree "Cupuaçu" (Theobroma grandiflorum) in Brazil and can defoliate saplings; the biology of this species has been studied and illustrated in some detail. The larva of this species lives about 15 days in 5 instars, the pupal stage lasts about 7 days and the adult lives about 10 days. M. tipulata and many other species can be found as adults through most of the year.

== DNA sequences ==
A few species have been sequenced for the mitochondrial genes "cytochrome oxidase I", and "ND1" and nuclear genes "Wingless" and "Ef-1", including Macrosoma semiermis. Some species are currently being barcoded.

== Sources ==
- Scoble, M.J. (1986). "The structure and affinities of the Hedyloidea: a new concept of the butterflies". Bulletin of the British Museum (Natural History), Entomology Series. 53: 251–286.
