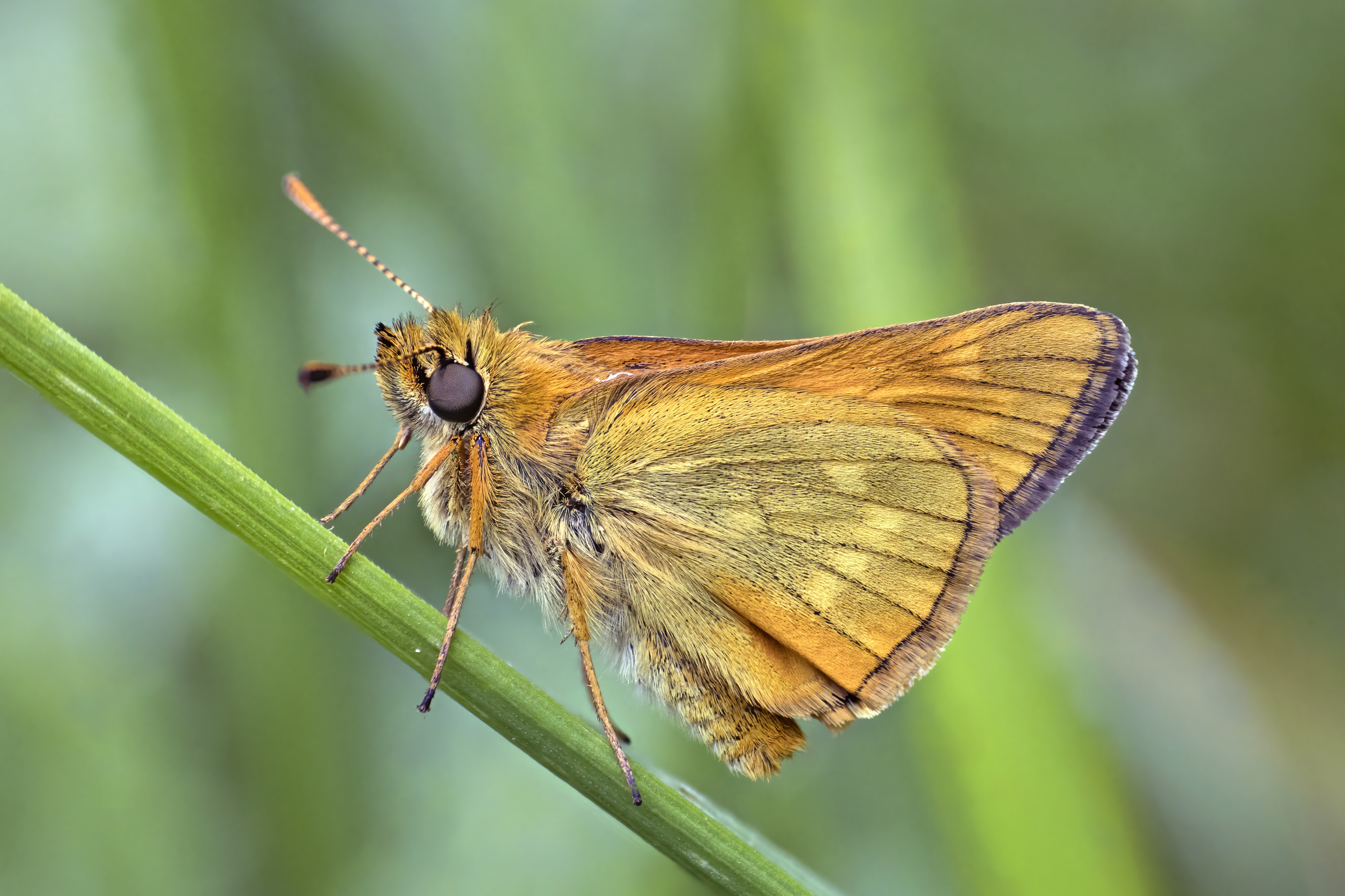
- Ochlodes sylvanus

Scientific classification
- Kingdom: Animalia
- Phylum: Arthropoda
- Clade: Pancrustacea
- Class: Insecta
- Order: Lepidoptera
- Superfamily: Papilionoidea
- Family: Hesperiidae; Latreille, 1809

Type species
- Hesperia comma Linnaeus, 1758

Diversity
- 12 subfamilies, about 550 genera

= Skipper (butterfly) =

Family of butterflies commonly called skippers

Western blue policeman (Pyrrhiades lucagus)

Skippers are a group of butterflies placed in the family Hesperiidae within the order Lepidoptera (moths and butterflies). They were previously placed in a separate superfamily, Hesperioidea, but have since been placed in the superfamily Papilionoidea (the butterflies). They are named for their quick, darting flight habits. Most have their antenna tips modified into narrow, hook-like projections. Moreover, skippers mostly lack wing-coupling structure available in most moths. More than 3500 species of skippers are recognized, and they occur worldwide, but with the greatest diversity in the Neotropical regions of Central and South America.

== Description and systematics ==
Traditionally, the Hesperiidae were placed in a monotypic superfamily Hesperioidea, because they are morphologically distinct from other Rhopalocera (butterflies), which mostly belong to the typical butterfly superfamily Papilionoidea. The third and rather small butterfly superfamily was the moth-butterflies (Hedyloidea), which are restricted to the Neotropics, but recent phylogenetic analyses suggest the traditional Papilionoidea are paraphyletic, thus recent classifications treat Hesperiidae and Hedylidae as families within an expanded Papilionoidea to reflect true cladistic relationships.

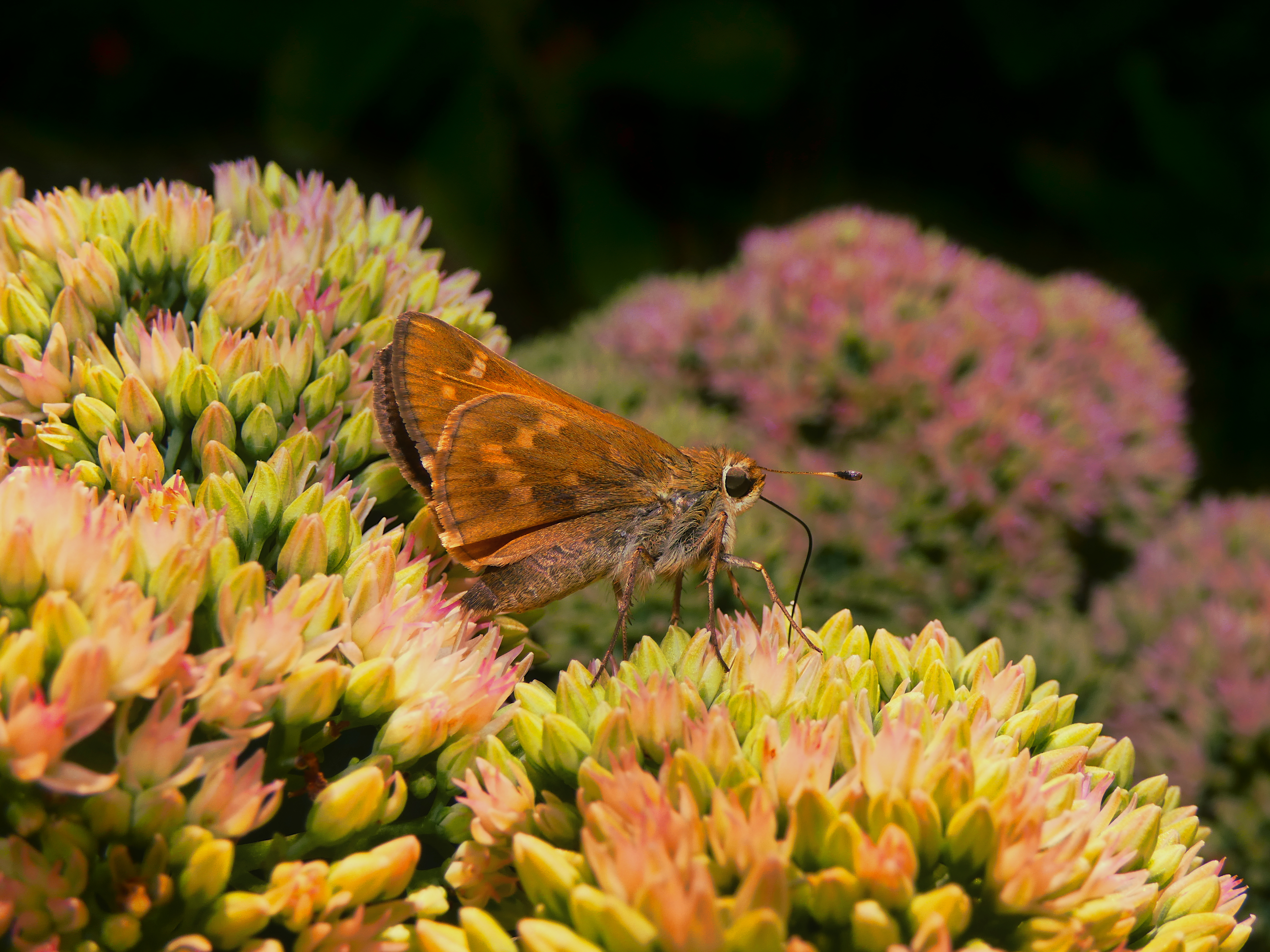
Grass skipper butterfly (Atalopedes campestris)

Collectively, these three groups of butterflies share many characteristics, especially in the egg, larval, and pupal stages. Nevertheless, skippers have the antennae clubs hooked backward like a crochet hook, while the typical butterflies have club-like tips to their antennae, and moth-butterflies have feathered or pectinate (comb-shaped) antennae similar to moths. Skippers also have generally stockier bodies and larger compound eyes than the other two groups, with stronger wing muscles in the plump thorax, in this resembling many moths more than the other two butterfly lineages do. Unlike, for example, the Arctiinae, though, their wings are usually small in proportion to their bodies. Some have larger wings, but only rarely as large in proportion to the body as in other butterflies. Skippers keep their wings usually angled upwards or spread out when at rest, and rarely fold them up completely.

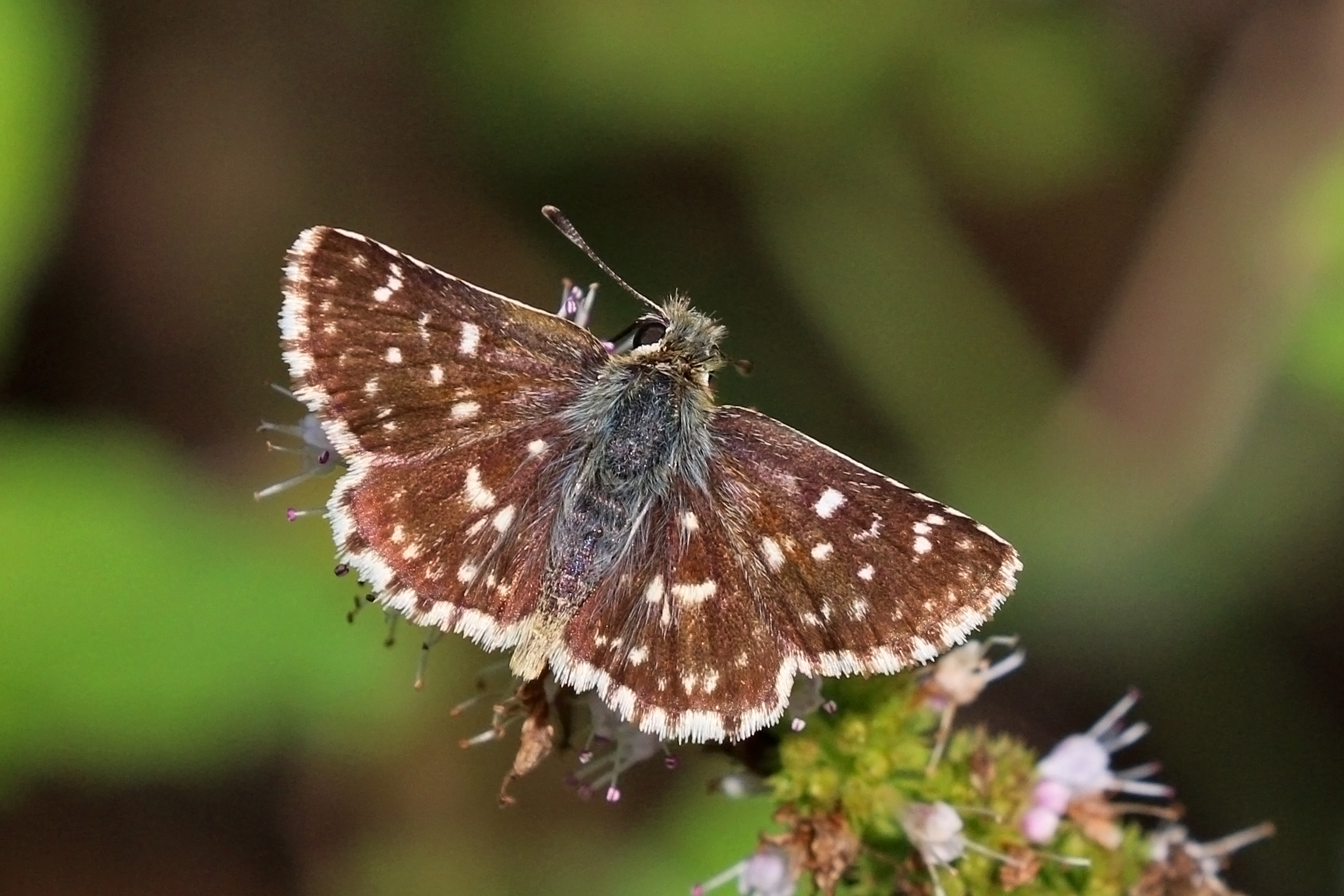
Red-underwing skipper (Spialia sertorius)

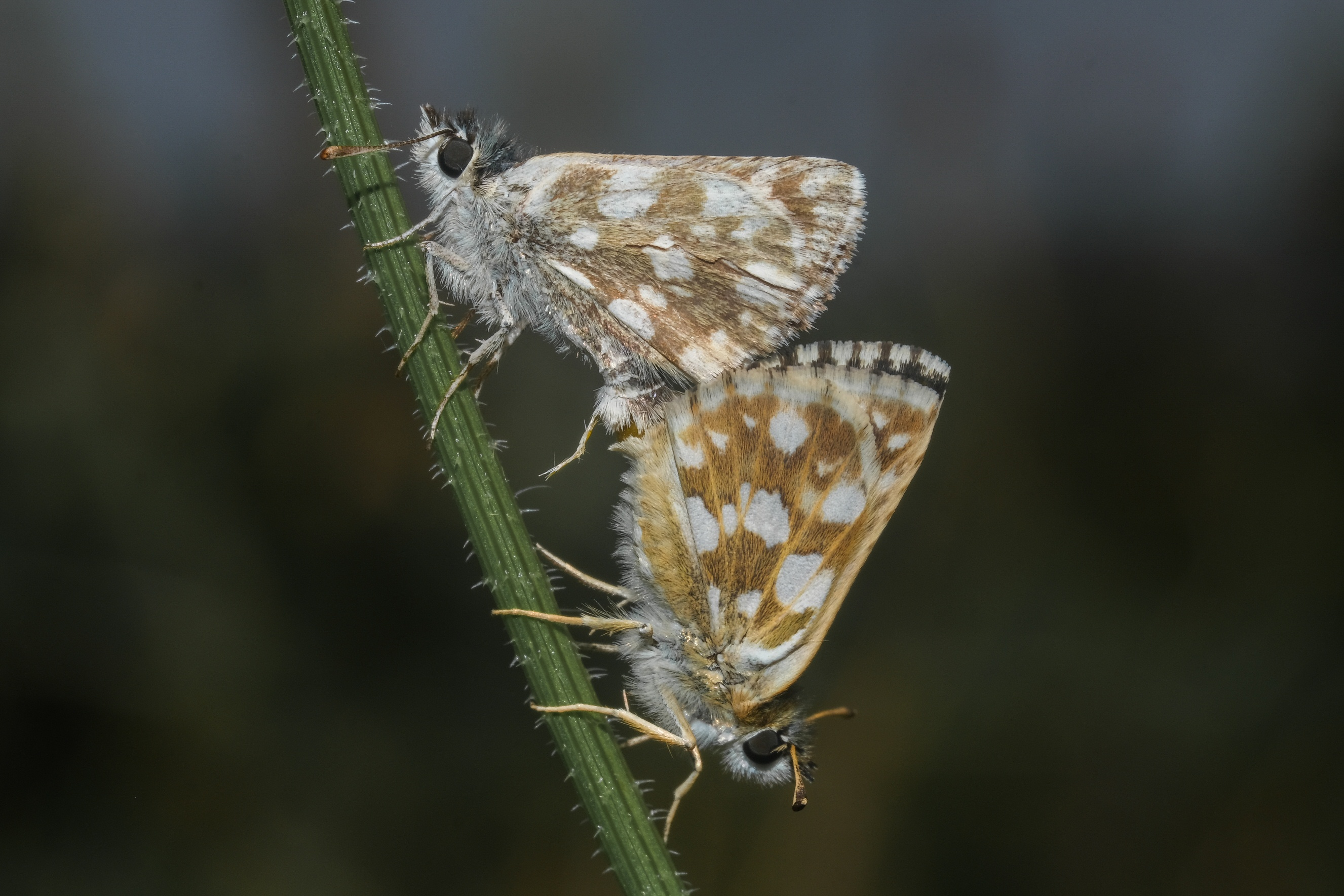
Mating pair of Oberthür's grizzled skippers (Pyrgus armoricanus)

Skipper nectaring

Several Peck's skippers (Polites peckius) on blossoms, including slow motion.

Silver-spotted skipper (Epargyreus clarus) nectaring

The wings are usually well-rounded with more or less sharply tipped forewings. Some have prominent hindwing tails, and others have more angled wings; the skippers' basic wing shapes do not vary much in comparison to the Papilionoidea, though. Most have a fairly drab coloration of browns and greys; some are more boldly black-and-white. Yellow, red, and blue hues are less often found, but some largely brown species are quite richly colored, too. Green colors and metallic iridescence are generally absent. Sexual dichromatism is present in some; males may have a blackish streak or patch of scent scales on their forewings.

Many species of skippers look very alike. For example, some species in the genera Amblyscirtes, Erynnis (duskywings), and Hesperia (branded skippers) cannot currently be distinguished in the field even by experts. The only reliable method of telling them apart involves dissection and microscopic examination of the genitalia, which have characteristic structures that prevent mating except between conspecifics.

== Subfamilies ==
The roughly 3500 species of skippers are classified in these subfamilies:

- Barcinae
- Katreinae
- Coeliadinae – awls, awlets, and policemen (about 75 species)
- Euschemoninae – regent skipper (monotypic)
- Eudaminae – dicot skippers
- Chamundinae (monotypic)
- Pyrginae – spread-winged skippers and firetips (including Pyrrhopyginae)
- Heteropterinae – skipperlings (about 150 species)
- Hesperiinae – grass skippers (over 2000 species)
- Megathyminae – giant skippers (about 18 species; doubtfully distinct from Hesperiinae)
- Trapezitinae – Australian skippers (about 60 species)
- Tagiadinae – tribes:
1. Celaenorrhinini Swinhoe, 1912
2. Netrocorynini Grishin, 2019
  - Netrocoryne C. Felder & R. Felder, 1867
3. Tagiadini Mabille, 1878
