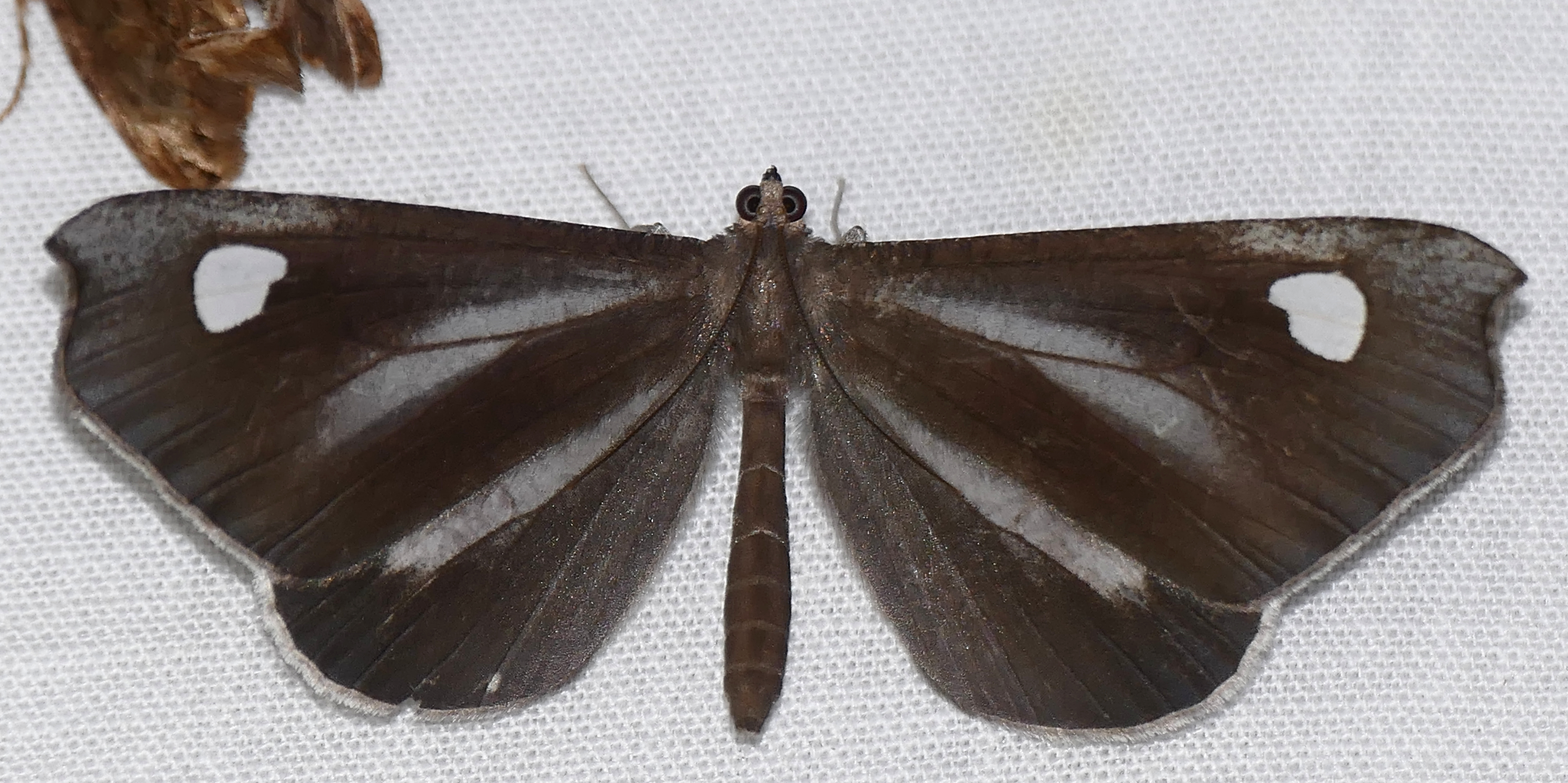

Scientific classification
- Domain: Eukaryota
- Kingdom: Animalia
- Phylum: Arthropoda
- Class: Insecta
- Order: Lepidoptera
- Family: Hedylidae
- Genus: Macrosoma
- Species: M. lucivittata

Binomial name
- Macrosoma lucivittata Walker, 1863

= Macrosoma lucivittata =

Species of butterfly

Macrosoma lucivittata is a moth-like butterfly in the family Hedylidae. It was described by Francis Walker in 1863.
