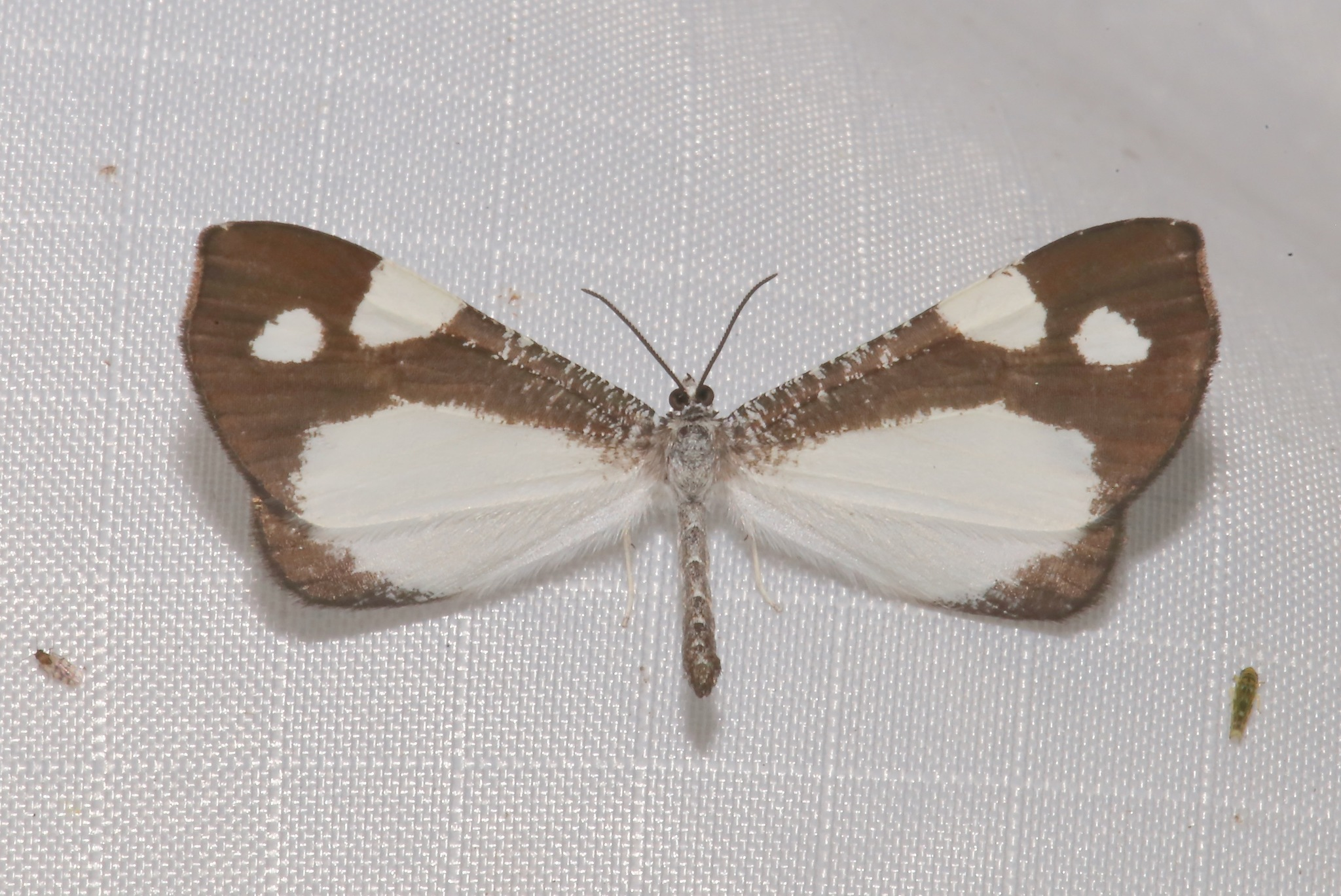

Scientific classification
- Domain: Eukaryota
- Kingdom: Animalia
- Phylum: Arthropoda
- Class: Insecta
- Order: Lepidoptera
- Family: Hedylidae
- Genus: Macrosoma
- Species: M. leucoplethes

Binomial name
- Macrosoma leucoplethes Prout, 1917

= Macrosoma leucoplethes =

Species of butterfly

Macrosoma leucoplethes is a moth-like butterfly in the family Hedylidae. It was described by Louis Beethoven Prout in 1917.
