= Macrosoma pectinogyna =

Scientific classification
- Kingdom: Animalia
- Phylum: Arthropoda
- Clade: Pancrustacea
- Class: Insecta
- Order: Lepidoptera
- Family: Hedylidae
- Genus: Macrosoma
- Species: M. pectinogyna

Binomial name
- Macrosoma pectinogyna Scoble, 1990

Species of butterfly

Macrosoma pectinogyna is a moth-like butterfly in the family Hedylidae. It was described by Malcolm J. Scoble in 1990.
