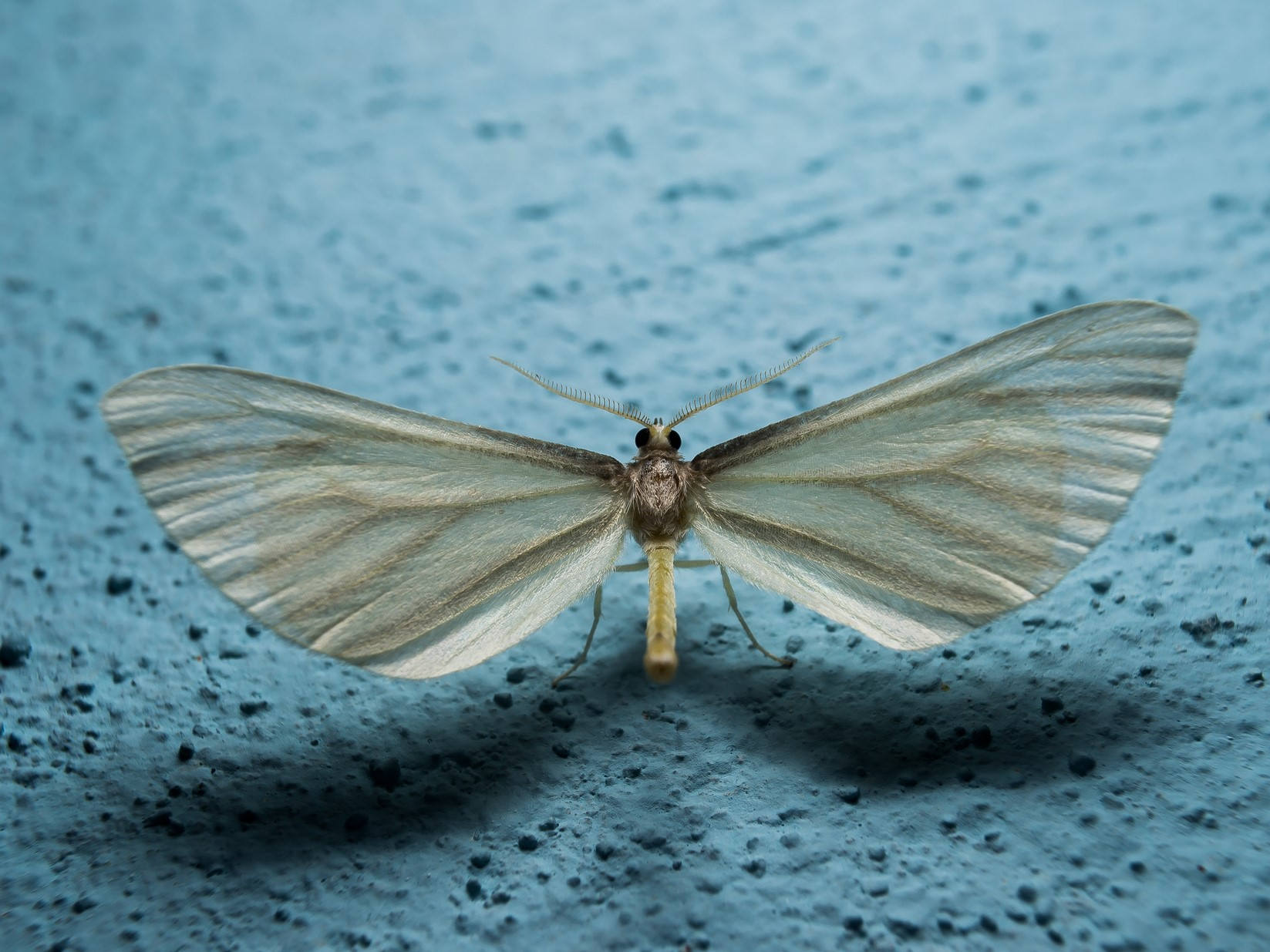

Scientific classification
- Domain: Eukaryota
- Kingdom: Animalia
- Phylum: Arthropoda
- Class: Insecta
- Order: Lepidoptera
- Family: Hedylidae
- Genus: Macrosoma
- Species: M. napiaria

Binomial name
- Macrosoma napiaria Guenée, 1857

= Macrosoma napiaria =

Species of butterfly

Macrosoma napiaria is a moth-like species of butterfly in the family Hedylidae. It was described by Achille Guenée in 1857.
