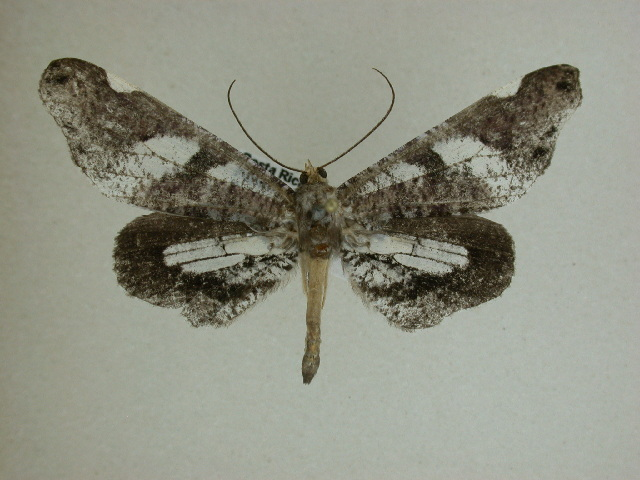

Scientific classification
- Domain: Eukaryota
- Kingdom: Animalia
- Phylum: Arthropoda
- Class: Insecta
- Order: Lepidoptera
- Family: Hedylidae
- Genus: Macrosoma
- Species: M. hyacinthina

Binomial name
- Macrosoma hyacinthina (Warren, 1905)

Synonyms
- Lasiopates hyacinthina Warren, 1905

= Macrosoma hyacinthina =

Species of butterfly

Macrosoma hyacinthina is moth-like butterfly described by William Warren in 1905. It belongs to the family Hedylidae. Originally it belonged to the genus Lasiopates. Malcolm J. Scoble combined it with Macrosoma in 1986.

== Distribution ==
The species is recorded from Costa Rica, northwest Ecuador, Fonte Boa of Brazil.

== Description ==
=== Wings ===
==== Male ====
The wings are greyish brown with a weak violet sheen and there are translucent areas on both forewing and hindwing. In the forewing the translucent area is crossed by a bar through the cell. The forewing is narrow with anal edge extended into a lobe at base with the white subtriangular mark on the costa. The hindwing with termen is weakly emarginate having under surface with small cuticular knob near base.

==== Female ====
Same as male, but the violet sheen is less pronounced. The hindwing is not emarginate and without lobe or cuticular knob.

Length of the forewing: 29–32 mm.

=== Genitalia ===
==== Male ====
Following are the characteristics of the male genitalia:

- The uncus is bifurcate.
- Gnathos has two halves not joined by sclerite.
- The valva is very distinctive with three short lobes.
- Juxta has a prominent U-shaped sclerite in ventral view.
- The aedeagus is well sclerotized.

==== Female ====
The female genitalia has the following features:

- The anal papillae are with apices blunt.
- Posterior apophysis is L-shaped and not strongly sclerotized.
- The corpus bursae has denticulate signum.

=== Antenna ===
Antenna is not bipectinate.

== Diagnosis ==
The violet sheen and large size of M. hyacinthina distinguishes it from all other species with the same general wing pattern. In the male genitalia the shapes of the gnathos, valva, and juxta are particularly distinct.
