= Macrosoma stabilinota =

Scientific classification
- Domain: Eukaryota
- Kingdom: Animalia
- Phylum: Arthropoda
- Class: Insecta
- Order: Lepidoptera
- Family: Hedylidae
- Genus: Macrosoma
- Species: M. stabilinota

Binomial name
- Macrosoma stabilinota Prout, 1932

Species of butterfly

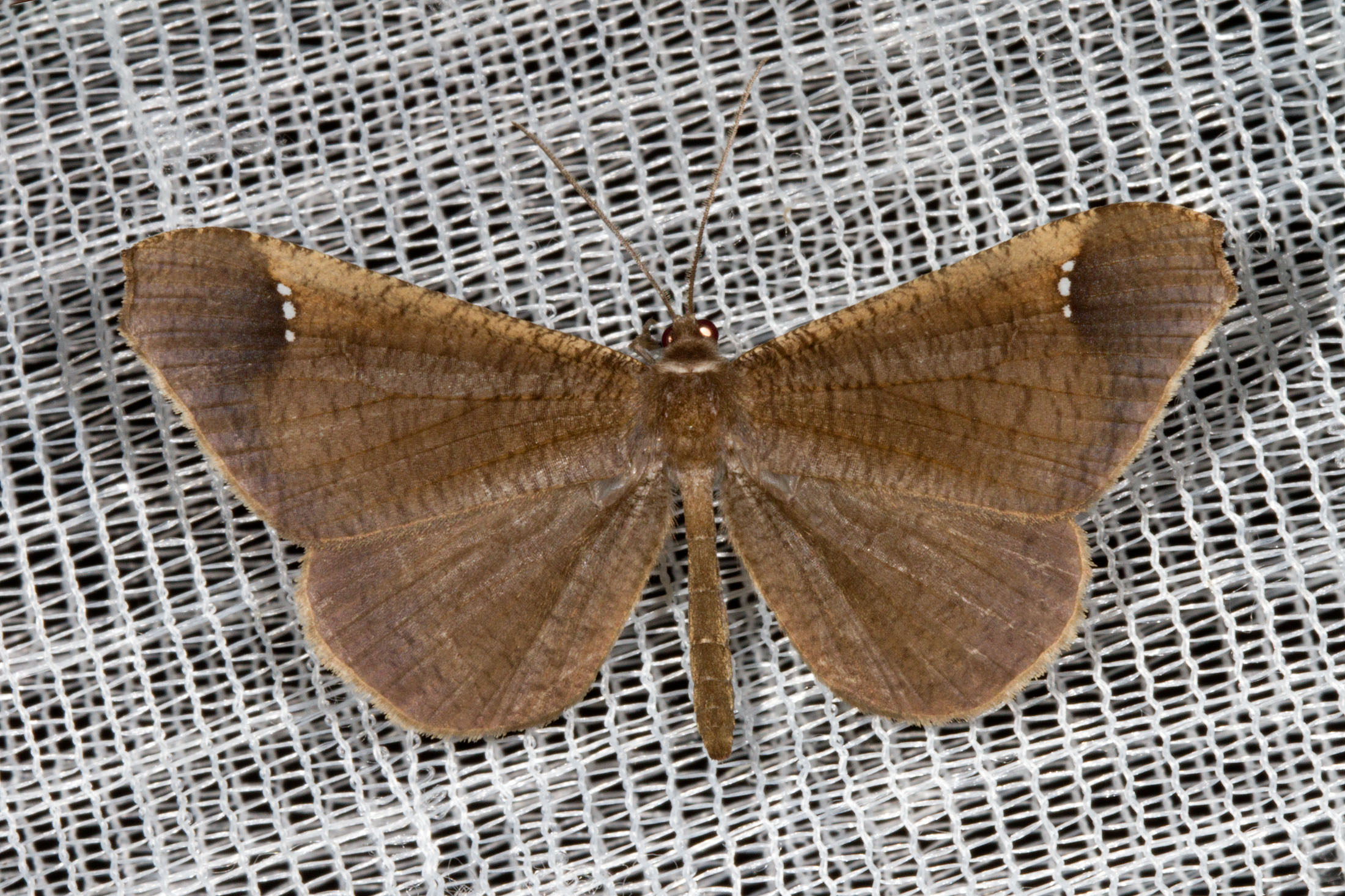

Macrosoma stabilinota is a moth-like butterfly in the family Hedylidae. It was described by Louis Beethoven Prout in 1932.
