= Macrosoma amaculata =

Scientific classification
- Kingdom: Animalia
- Phylum: Arthropoda
- Clade: Pancrustacea
- Class: Insecta
- Order: Lepidoptera
- Family: Hedylidae
- Genus: Macrosoma
- Species: M. amaculata

Binomial name
- Macrosoma amaculata Scoble, 1990

Species of butterfly

Macrosoma amaculata is moth-like butterfly described by Malcolm Scoble in 1990. It belongs to the family Hedylidae.

== Distribution ==
The species is found in the central western and northwestern Costa Rica: Guanacaste Province from 200 to 2,100 meters above sea level on both slopes of the Cordillera de Guanacaste, Tilarán and Talamanca, in the Osa Peninsula and the Valley of Talamanca.

== Description ==
The species is sexually dimorphic.

=== Wings ===
M. amaculata has wings of greyish brown ground color. The apex of the forewing is dark brown and weakly emarginate with a notch which is present in both sexes (more pronounced in females). The edge of the apical patch is without white markings of the male whereas the female has a white patch of moderately sized close to the apex with two adjacent very small white spots. The hindwing lacks glassy patch at the base for both sexes; a dark brown color strip runs from the apex to lathe, parallel to the middle area.
The length of the forewing of male is 20 mm.
The length of the forewing of female is 22 mm.

=== Genitalia ===
==== Male ====
Following are the characteristics of the genitalia:

- The Gnathos is broad and denticulate. The medial component is very short and is not downcurved.
- Valva is subtriangular.

=== Antenna ===
The antenna is not bipectinate for both gender.

== Diagnosis ==
This species differs from M. bahiata in lacking the dark subapical spot on the forewing, and from M. uniformis by the absence of the small glassy patch at the base of the hindwing. The shapes of the Gnathos and Valva differ between M. amaculata and other species of this genus.
