= Macrosoma leptosiata =

Scientific classification
- Domain: Eukaryota
- Kingdom: Animalia
- Phylum: Arthropoda
- Class: Insecta
- Order: Lepidoptera
- Family: Hedylidae
- Genus: Macrosoma
- Species: M. leptosiata

Binomial name
- Macrosoma leptosiata Felder & Rogenhofer, 1875

Species of butterfly

Macrosoma leptosiata is a moth-like butterfly in the family Hedylidae. It was described by Cajetan von Felder and Alois Friedrich Rogenhofer in 1875.
