= Hedylus =

Hedylus (Ancient Greek: Ἥδυλος, Hḗdylos; fl. 3rd century BC) was a Greek epigrammatic poet of the Hellenistic period.

Hedylus was the son Hedyle, and a native of Samos or Athens. His epigrams were included in the Garland of Meleager. Eleven of them are in the Greek Anthology, but the genuineness of two of these is very doubtful. Most of his epigrams are in praise of wine, and all of them are sportive. In some he describes the dedicatory offerings in the temple of Arsinoe, among which he mentions the hydraulic organ of Ctesibius. Besides this indication of his time, we know that he was the contemporary and rival of Callimachus and friend of Poseidippus of Pella. He lived therefore in the reign of Ptolemy II Philadelphus, and is to be classed with the Alexandrian school of poets.
