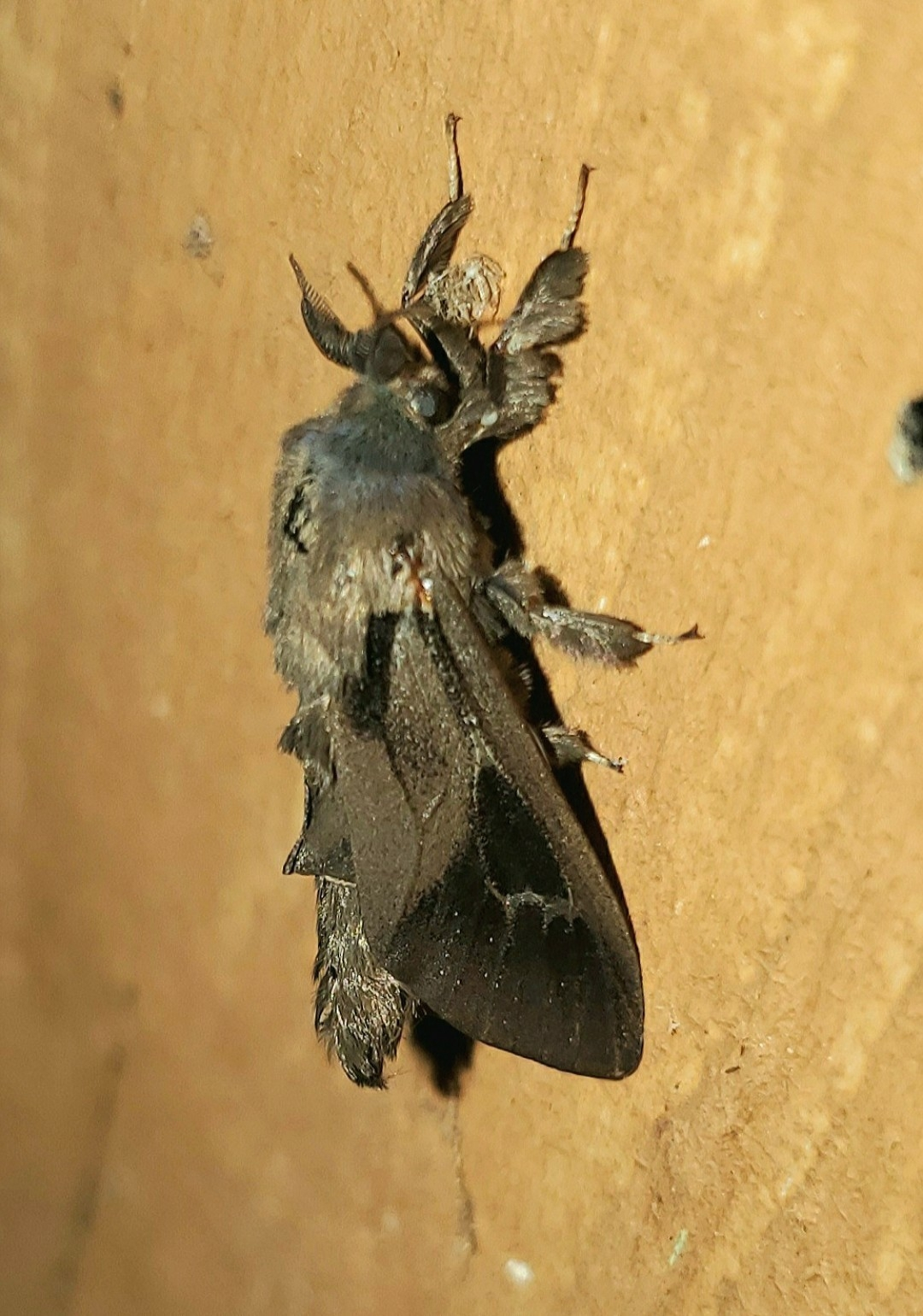

Scientific classification
- Kingdom: Animalia
- Phylum: Arthropoda
- Class: Insecta
- Order: Lepidoptera
- Family: Psychidae
- Genus: Oiketicus
- Species: O. abbotii

Binomial name
- Oiketicus abbotii Grote, 1880

= Oiketicus abbotii =

Abbot's bagworm moth

Species of moth

Oiketicus abbotii (Abbot's bagworm moth) is a moth of the family Psychidae. It is found in southeastern North America, including Florida and Louisiana.

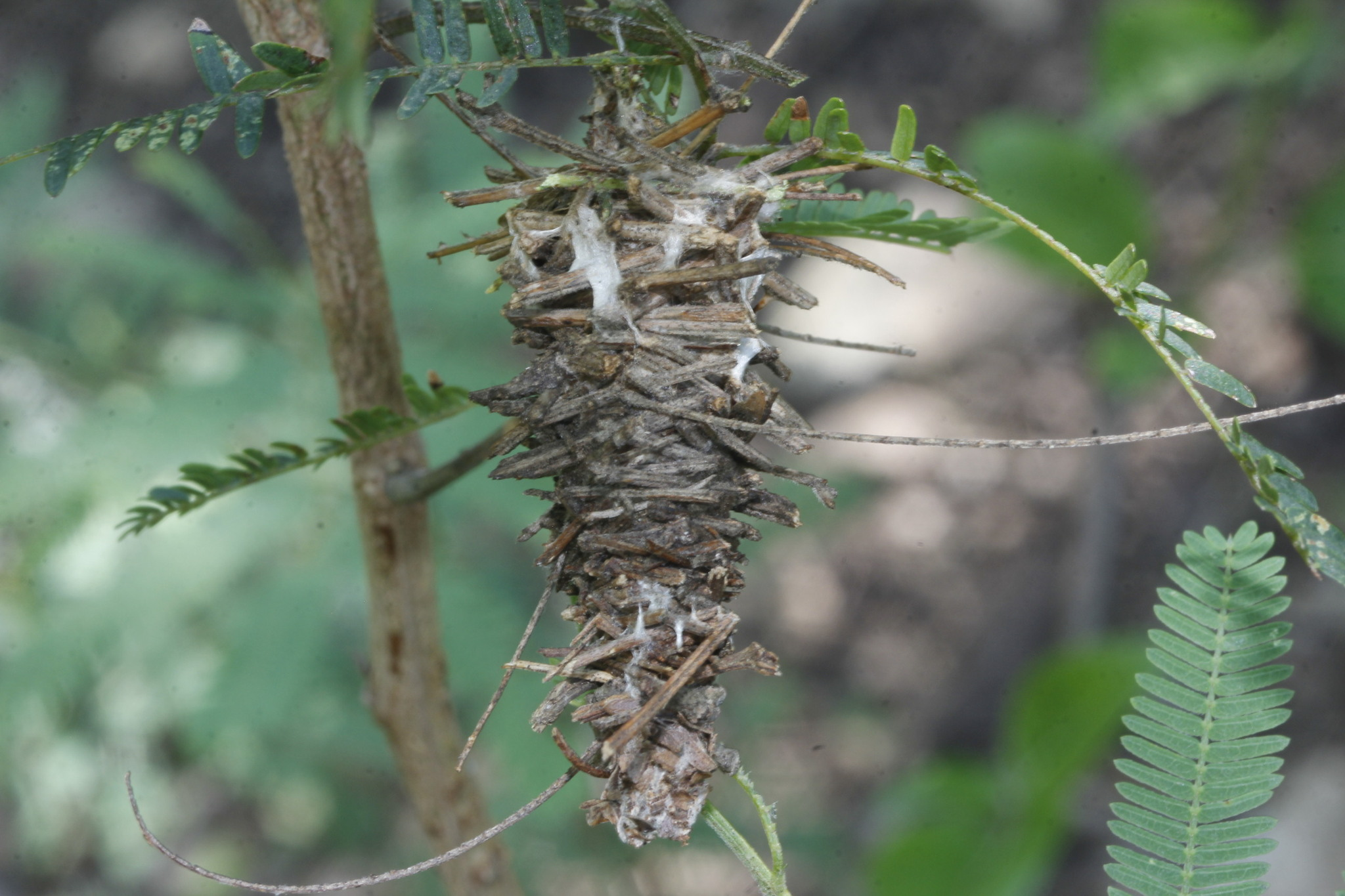
Oiketicus abbotii case

There is strong sexual dimorphism in the adults.

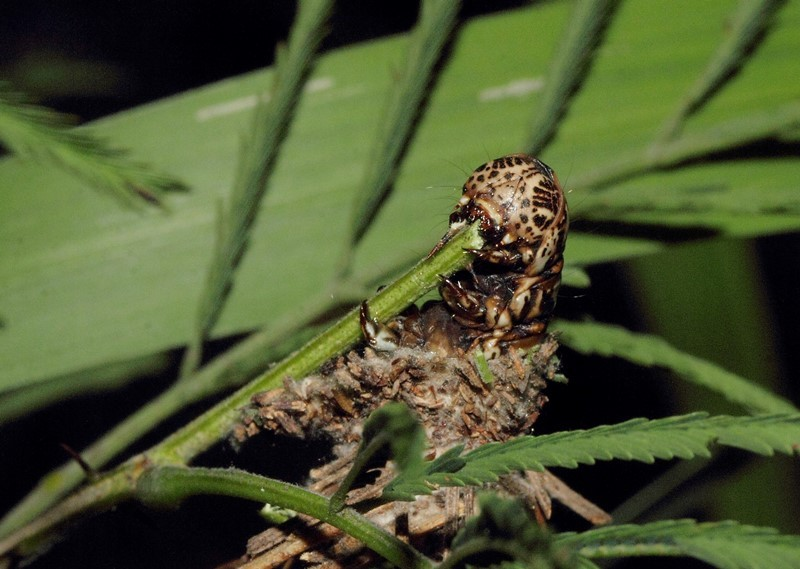
Oiketicus abbotii larva emerging from case
