= Macrosoma albistria =

Scientific classification
- Kingdom: Animalia
- Phylum: Arthropoda
- Class: Insecta
- Order: Lepidoptera
- Family: Hedylidae
- Genus: Macrosoma
- Species: M. albistria

Binomial name
- Macrosoma albistria Prout, 1916

Synonyms
- Phellinodes albistria Prout, 1916

Species of butterfly

Macrosoma albistria is moth-like butterfly described by Louis Beethoven Prout in 1916. It belongs to the family Hedylidae. Originally it belonged to the genus Phellinodes. Malcolm J. Scoble combined it with Macrosoma in 1986.

== Distribution ==
The species is found in the central and southern Peru: Carabaya Province, La Unión Province; southern Bolivia.

== Description ==
=== Male ===
==== Wings ====
Male M. albistria has wings of greyish brown ground colour. The apex of the forewing is dark brown and weakly emarginate. The dark apical has three 3 small white marks at proximal edge. The termen has poorly defined whitish weak dark streak from the costa. Spot is found medially along the costa. The hindwing is small glassy and has patch at the base.
The length of the forewing is 17–20 mm.

==== Genitalia ====
Following are the characteristics of the genitalia:

- The medial element of Gnathos is tongue-shaped, with minute denticles, weakly downcurved and laterally denticulate.
- Valva is narrow.

==== Antenna ====
The antenna is not bipectinate.

== Diagnosis ==
This species is distinguished from M. coscoja by the weaker downcurving of the gnathos, and by the shape of the valva. The forewing of M. albistria lacks the narrow, postmedial streak which is found in M. coscoja. The glassy patch at the base of the hindwing is present in M. albistria but absent in M. coscoja.

== Behaviour and Habitat ==
In addition to the morphological traits, M. albistria exhibits subtle behavioral adaptations that aid in its survival. This butterfly is primarily crepuscular, becoming most active during dawn and dusk, which helps it avoid many predators. Its wing coloration not only provides camouflage among the forest foliage but also plays a role in signaling during mating displays. Observations suggest that M. albistria prefers humid, forested habitats with abundant understory vegetation, which offers both shelter and feeding opportunities.
