= Macrosoma lamellifera =

Scientific classification
- Domain: Eukaryota
- Kingdom: Animalia
- Phylum: Arthropoda
- Class: Insecta
- Order: Lepidoptera
- Family: Hedylidae
- Genus: Macrosoma
- Species: M. lamellifera

Binomial name
- Macrosoma lamellifera Prout, 1916

Species of butterfly

Macrosoma lamellifera is a moth-like butterfly in the family Hedylidae. It was described by Louis Beethoven Prout in 1916. It is hypothesized to be closely related to Macrosoma rubedinaria and Macrosoma ustrinaria, and though these groups fall within the same clade, they do not form a monophyletic group.
