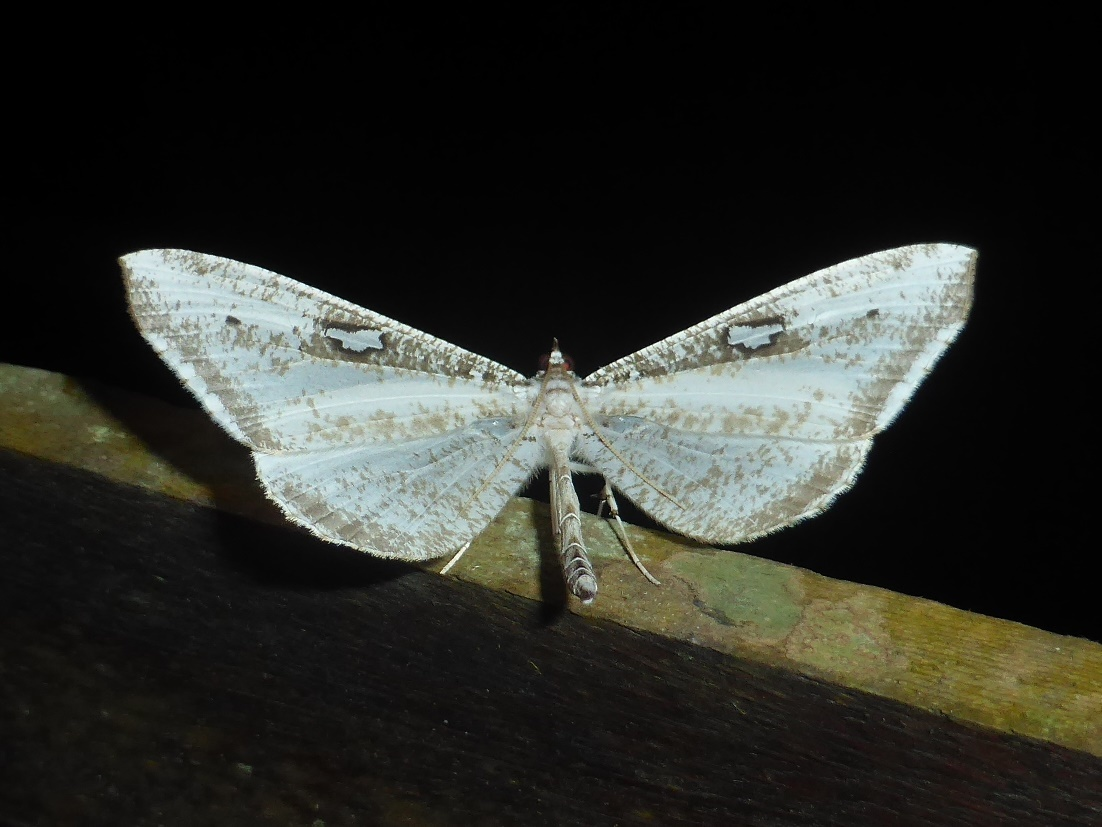

Scientific classification
- Domain: Eukaryota
- Kingdom: Animalia
- Phylum: Arthropoda
- Class: Insecta
- Order: Lepidoptera
- Family: Hedylidae
- Genus: Macrosoma
- Species: M. tipulata

Binomial name
- Macrosoma tipulata Hübner, 1818

= Macrosoma tipulata =

Species of butterfly

Macrosoma tipulata is a moth-like butterfly in the family Hedylidae. It was described by Jacob Hübner in 1818.
