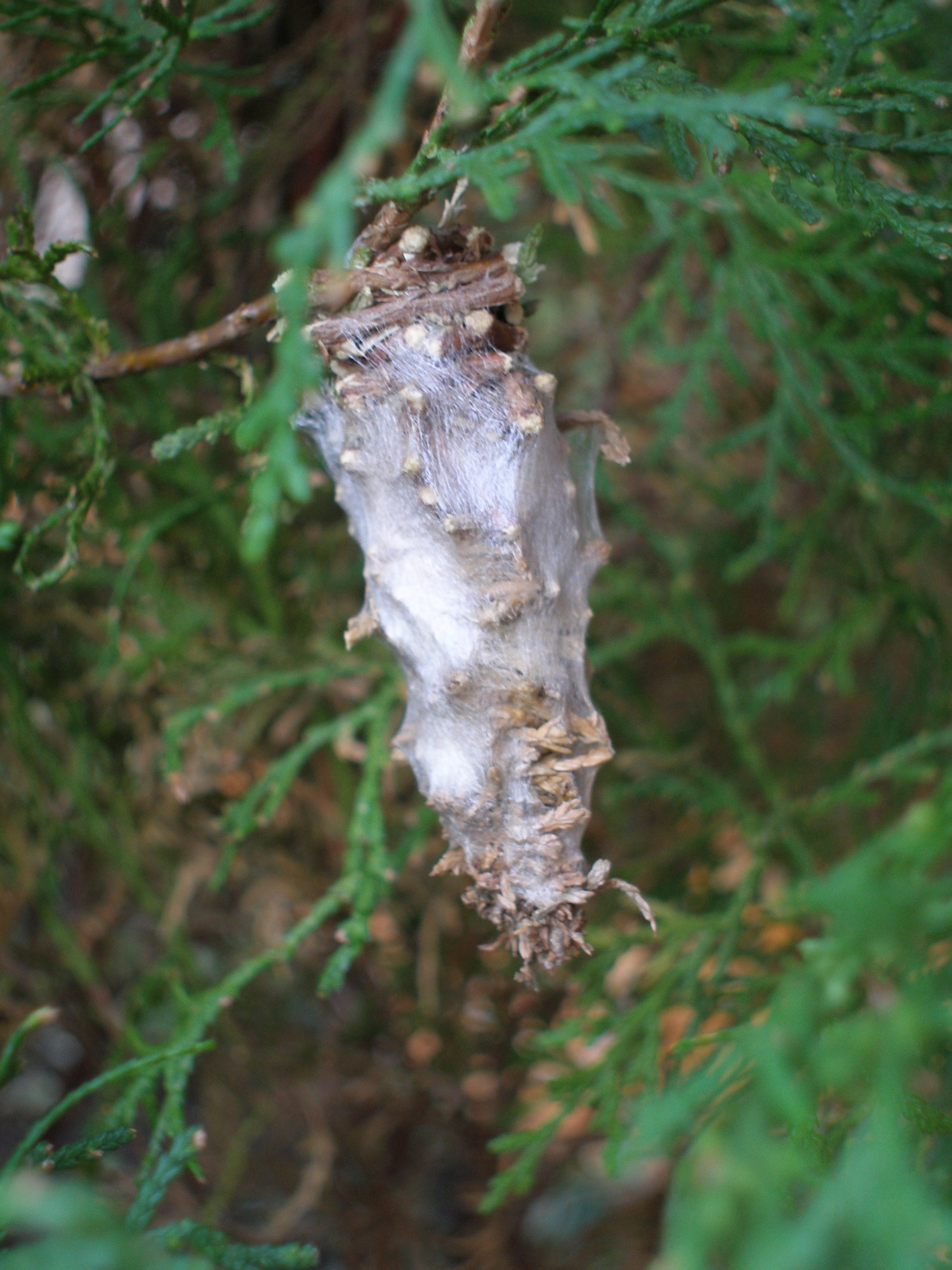
- Cocoon

Scientific classification
- Kingdom: Animalia
- Phylum: Arthropoda
- Class: Insecta
- Order: Lepidoptera
- Family: Psychidae
- Genus: Oiketicus
- Species: O. kirbyi

Binomial name
- Oiketicus kirbyi Guilding, 1827

= Oiketicus kirbyi =

Species of moth

Oiketicus kirbyi is a moth of the family Psychidae. It is found in lowlands from Argentina to Mexico and on the Caribbean islands.

There is strong sexual dimorphism in the adults. Females are wingless.

The larvae feed on various plants, including Musa, Theobroma cacao, Elaeis guineensis, Bactris gasipaes, Cocos nucifera, Citrus, Tectona grandis, Eucalyptus, Persea americana, Eriobotrya japonica and Terminalia catappa.
