= Macrosoma muscerdata =

Scientific classification
- Domain: Eukaryota
- Kingdom: Animalia
- Phylum: Arthropoda
- Class: Insecta
- Order: Lepidoptera
- Family: Hedylidae
- Genus: Macrosoma
- Species: M. muscerdata

Binomial name
- Macrosoma muscerdata C. Felder & Rogenhofer, 1875

Species of butterfly

Macrosoma muscerdata is a moth-like butterfly in the family Hedylidae. It was described by Austrian entomologists Cajetan von Felder and Alois Friedrich Rogenhofer in 1875.
