= Macrosoma minutipuncta =

Scientific classification
- Domain: Eukaryota
- Kingdom: Animalia
- Phylum: Arthropoda
- Class: Insecta
- Order: Lepidoptera
- Family: Hedylidae
- Genus: Macrosoma
- Species: M. minutipuncta

Binomial name
- Macrosoma minutipuncta Prout, 1916

Species of butterfly

Macrosoma minutipuncta is a species of moth in the family Hedylidae. It was scientifically described by Louis Beethoven Prout in 1916.
