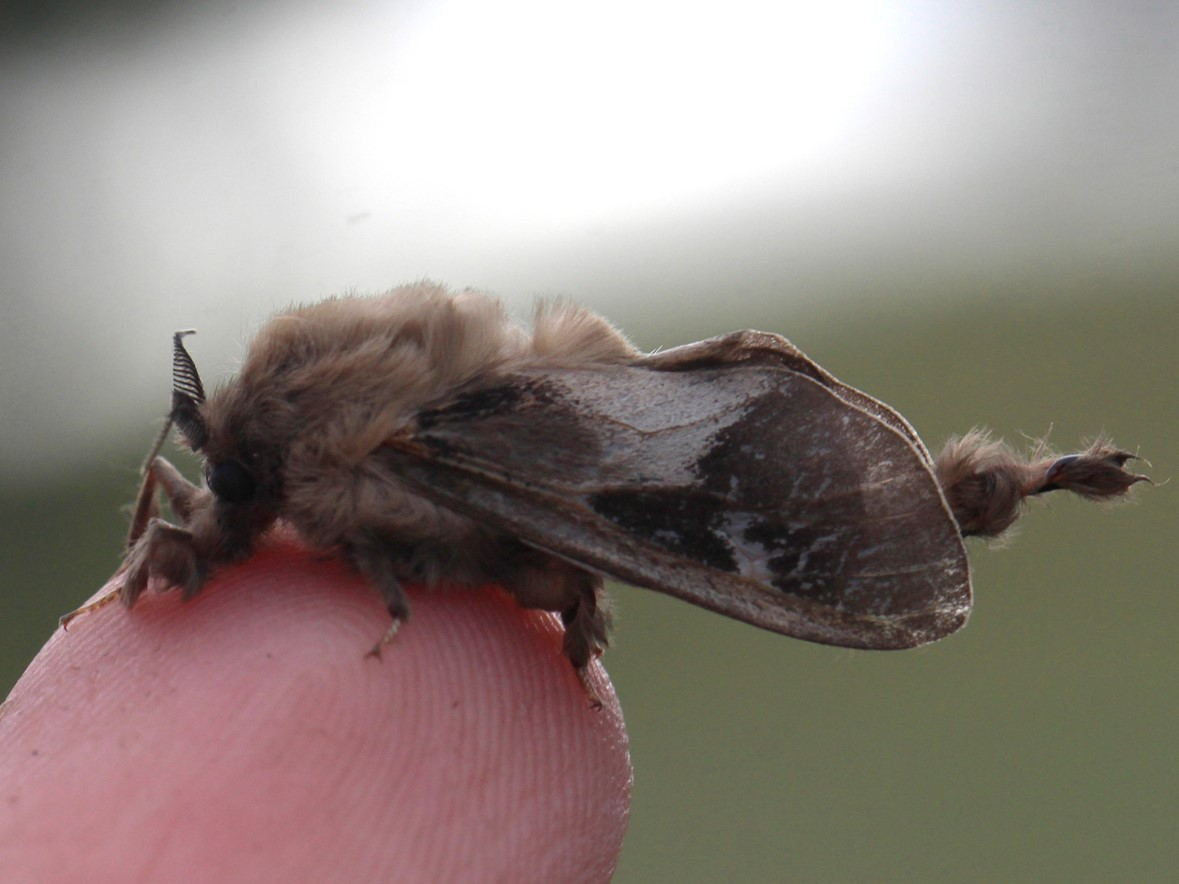
- Oiketicus platensis

Scientific classification
- Domain: Eukaryota
- Kingdom: Animalia
- Phylum: Arthropoda
- Class: Insecta
- Order: Lepidoptera
- Family: Psychidae
- Subfamily: Oiketicinae
- Genus: Oiketicus; Guilding, 1827

Synonyms
- Oeceticus Harris, 1841

= Oiketicus =

Genus of moths

Oiketicus is a genus of moths in the family Psychidae.

== Species ==
- Oiketicus abbotii Grote, 1880 - Abbot's bagworm moth
- Oiketicus herrichii (Westwood, 1855)
- Oiketicus kirbyi Guilding, 1827
- Oiketicus toumeyi F. M. Jones, 1922
- Oiketicus townsendi Townsend, 1894
- Oiketicus platensis Berg, 1883
