= Wing coupling =

Phenomenon in insects

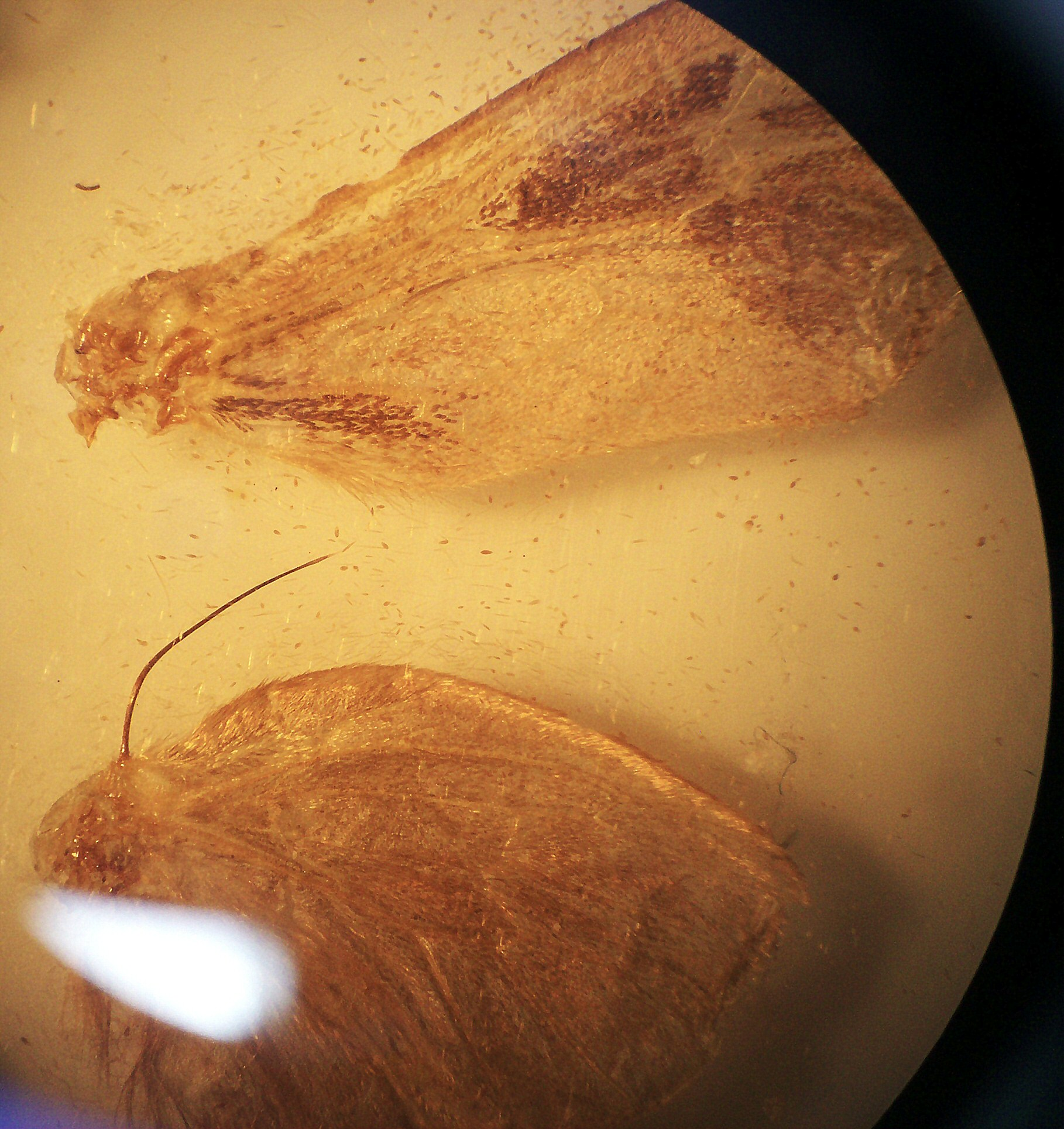
Oiketicus spp. (family Psychidae). The frenulum can be seen at the top of the rear wing, which hooks onto the retinaculum, seen here as a small brush on the front wing, so that the wings travel together during flight. Magnification: 10x

Some four-winged insect orders, such as the Lepidoptera, have developed a wide variety of morphological wing coupling mechanisms in the imago which render these taxa as "functionally dipterous" (effectively two-winged) for efficient insect flight. All but the most basal forms exhibit this wing coupling.

The mechanisms are of three different types - jugal, frenulo-retinacular and amplexiform.

== Jugal wing coupling ==
The more primitive groups of moth have an enlarged lobe-like area near the basal posterior margin, i.e. at the base of the forewing, called jugum, that folds under the hindwing in flight.

== Frenulo-retinacular wing coupling ==
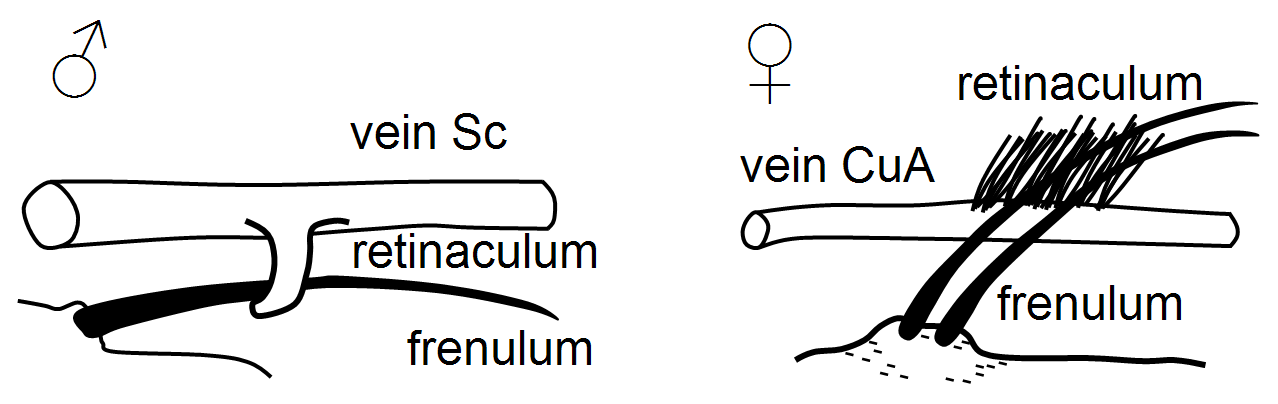
Examples of frenulo-retinacular wing coupling in male and female moths

Other groups of moth have a frenulum on the hindwing that hooks under a retinaculum on the forewing. The retinaculum is a hook or tuft on the underside of the forewing of some moths. Along with the frenulum, a spine at the base of the forward or costal edge of the hindwing, it forms a coupling mechanism for the front and rear wings of the moth.

== Amplexiform wing coupling ==
In the butterflies (Note: The male of one species of hesperiid (skipper) butterfly does have wing couplings.) and in the Bombycoidea, (Note: The Sphingidae (hawk moths) however do have wing couplings.) there is no arrangement of frenulum and retinaculum to couple the wings. Instead, an enlarged humeral area of the hindwing is broadly overlapped by the forewing. Despite the absence of a specific mechanical connection, the wings overlap and operate in phase. The power stroke of the forewing pushes down the hindwing in unison. This type of coupling is a variation of frenate type but where the frenulum and retinaculum are completely lost.

== Hamuli wing coupling ==
Hamuli wing coupling is a mechanism unique to winged Hymenoptera. The hamuli consist of hook-like setae arrayed along the leading edge of the hind wing that engage with the recurved trailing edge (the retinaculum) of the fore wing during flight, uniting both wings into a single functional wing.

leafcutter bee taking flight from Great Valley gumplant. Its left pair of wings have not hooked together resulting in the hind wing not contributing to lift and the bee holding its legs to the right

== Sources ==
- Pinhey, E (1962). Hawk Moths of Central and Southern Africa. Longmans Southern Africa, Cape Town.
