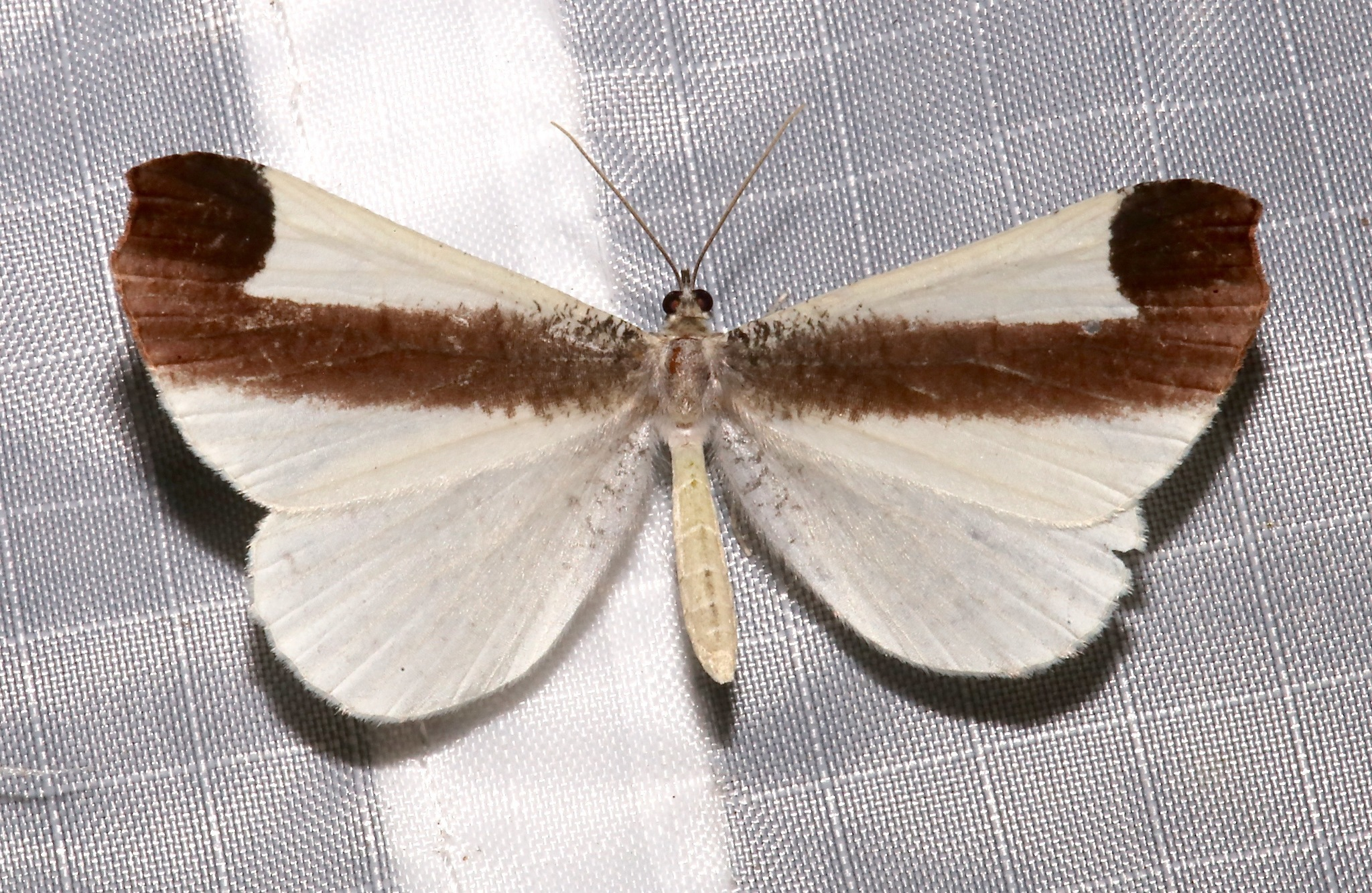

Scientific classification
- Domain: Eukaryota
- Kingdom: Animalia
- Phylum: Arthropoda
- Class: Insecta
- Order: Lepidoptera
- Family: Hedylidae
- Genus: Macrosoma
- Species: M. leucophasiata

Binomial name
- Macrosoma leucophasiata Thierry-Mieg, 1904

= Macrosoma leucophasiata =

Species of butterfly

Macrosoma leucophasiata is a moth-like butterfly in the family Hedylidae. It was described by Paul Thierry-Mieg in 1904.
