= Macrosoma satellitiata =

Scientific classification
- Domain: Eukaryota
- Kingdom: Animalia
- Phylum: Arthropoda
- Class: Insecta
- Order: Lepidoptera
- Family: Hedylidae
- Genus: Macrosoma
- Species: M. satellitiata

Binomial name
- Macrosoma satellitiata Guenée, 1857

Species of butterfly

Macrosoma satellitiata is a moth-like butterfly in the family Hedylidae. It was described by Achille Guenée in 1857.
