= Macrosoma ustrinaria =

Scientific classification
- Domain: Eukaryota
- Kingdom: Animalia
- Phylum: Arthropoda
- Class: Insecta
- Order: Lepidoptera
- Family: Hedylidae
- Genus: Macrosoma
- Species: M. ustrinaria

Binomial name
- Macrosoma ustrinaria Herrich-Schäffer, 1854

Species of butterfly

Macrosoma ustrinaria is a moth-like butterfly in the family Hedylidae. It was described by Gottlieb August Wilhelm Herrich-Schäffer in 1854.
