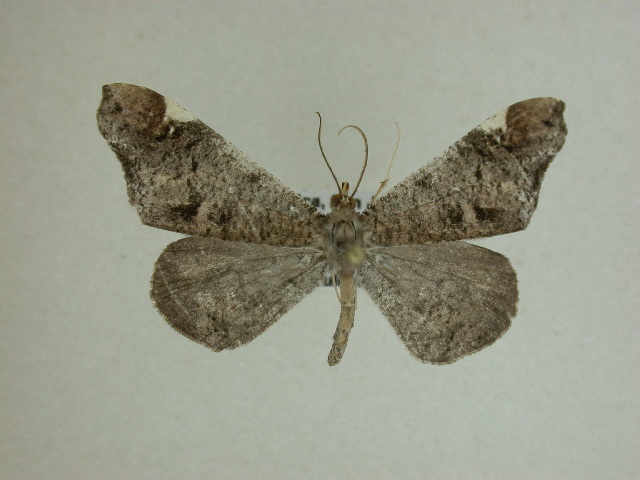

Scientific classification
- Domain: Eukaryota
- Kingdom: Animalia
- Phylum: Arthropoda
- Class: Insecta
- Order: Lepidoptera
- Family: Hedylidae
- Genus: Macrosoma
- Species: M. cascaria

Binomial name
- Macrosoma cascaria (Schaus, 1901)

Synonyms
- Hyphedyle cascaria Schaus, 1901

= Macrosoma cascaria =

Species of butterfly

Macrosoma cascaria is moth-like butterfly described by William Schaus in 1901. It belongs to the family Hedylidae. Originally it belonged to the genus Hyphedyle. Malcolm J. Scoble combined it with Macrosoma in 1986.

== Distribution ==
The species is found in Mexico: Xalapa, Tabasco and Misantla near the coast north of Veracruz to the northern Venezuela.

== Description ==
=== Wings ===
M. cascaria has wings of the ground colour which is more brown than greyish brown. The forewing has various brown-black markings and white triangular mark on costa; apex is chestnut brown.
The length of the forewing is 19–26 mm.

=== Genitalia ===
==== Male ====
Following are the characteristics of the male genitalia:

- Saccus is fairly short.
- Gnathos with the central element is downcurved.
- Valva is subtriangular.

==== Female ====
The female genitalia has the following features:

- The anal papillae is fairly short.
- Corpus bursae is elongated, broadening gradually from ductus.
- Signum is denticulate.

=== Antenna ===
The antenna is not bipectinate in both sexes.

== Diagnosis ==
The male genitalia are extremely similar to those of M. albifascia, but the chestnut apical patch in M. cascaria and the absence of the broad white forewing band make the two species easy to distinguish. The colour pattern is most closely resembles to that of M. paularia, but M. cascaria differs in having the white, costal patch and darker hindwings. The shape of the Gnathos also differs in having the medial element downcurved.

== Foodplant ==
The foodplant is Croton sp. of the Euphorbiaceae.
