= Hedyle =

Ancient Greek iambographer and epigrammatist

Hedyle (Ancient Greek: Ἥδυλη, Hḗdylē; fl. 4th century BC) was an ancient Greek poet. She is known only through a mention in Athenaeus' Deipnosophistae. According to Athenaeus, Hedyle was the daughter of an Attic poet, Moschine, who is otherwise unknown, and the mother of Hedylus, another poet. Hedyle was probably Athenian, like her mother.

The only surviving fragment of Hedyle's poetry consists of two and a half couplets from her elegiac poem Scylla, quoted by Athenaeus. The poem is about the myth of Scylla, a human woman who was courted by the merman Glaucus. Hedyle's version of the myth may have portrayed Glaucus committing suicide after being rejected by Scylla.

In the version of the story told by Ovid in his Metamorphoses, Scylla was turned into a sea-monster by Circe, who was jealous of Glaucus' love for her. Dunstan Lowe argues that Hedyle's version of the myth of Scylla was the inspiration for Ovid's version of the myth. Josephine Balmer argues that Hedyle's choice of subject is part of a tradition of Greek women poets reinterpreting the dangerous women in Homer's Iliad and Odyssey in a more sympathetic light, comparing it to the sympathetic portrayal of Helen of Troy in Sappho 16.
