= Macrosoma paularia =

Scientific classification
- Domain: Eukaryota
- Kingdom: Animalia
- Phylum: Arthropoda
- Class: Insecta
- Order: Lepidoptera
- Family: Hedylidae
- Genus: Macrosoma
- Species: M. paularia

Binomial name
- Macrosoma paularia Schaus, 1901

Species of butterfly

Macrosoma paularia is a moth-like butterfly in the family Hedylidae. It was described by William Schaus in 1901.
