= Macrosoma uniformis =

Scientific classification
- Domain: Eukaryota
- Kingdom: Animalia
- Phylum: Arthropoda
- Class: Insecta
- Order: Lepidoptera
- Family: Hedylidae
- Genus: Macrosoma
- Species: M. uniformis

Binomial name
- Macrosoma uniformis Warren, 1904

Species of butterfly

Macrosoma uniformis is a moth-like butterfly in the family Hedylidae. It was described by William Warren in 1904.
