= Hyphedyle =

Scientific classification
- Kingdom: Animalia
- Phylum: Arthropoda
- Class: Insecta
- Order: Lepidoptera
- Family: Geometridae
- Genus: Hyphedyle; Warren, 1894
- Species: H. rubedinaria

Binomial name
- Hyphedyle rubedinaria (Walker, 1862)

Genus of moths

Hyphedyle is a monotypic moth genus in the family Geometridae described by Warren in 1894. Its only species, Hyphedyle rubedinaria, was first described by Francis Walker in 1862. It was found in Honduras.
