= Vitellogenesis =

Formation of yolk to be used for embryonic nutrition

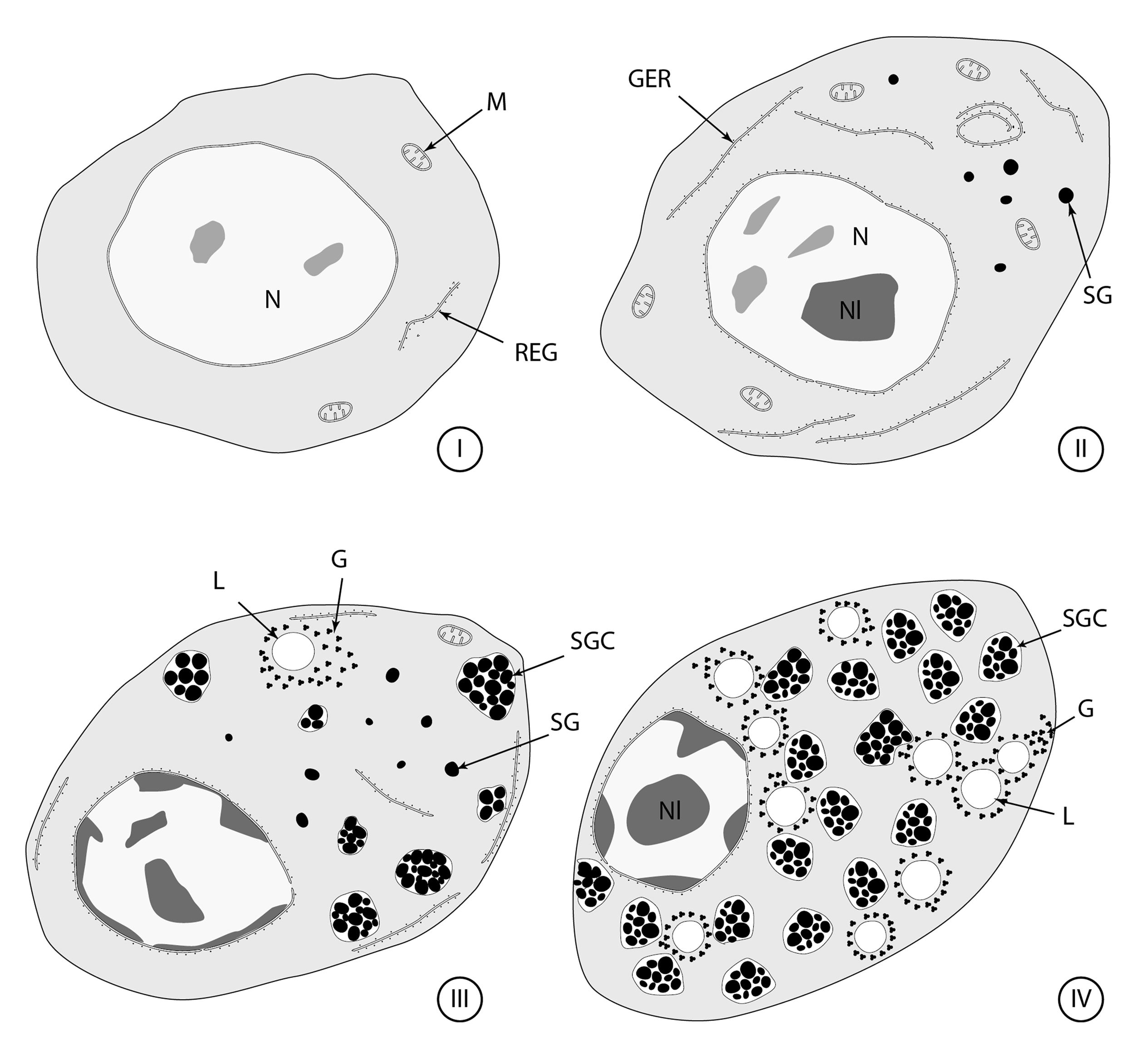
Diagram of vitellogenesis in the digenean Crepidostomum metoecus. GER: granular endoplasmic reticulum; L: lipid droplet; M: mitochondrion; N: nucleus; Nl: nucleolus; SG: shell globule; SGC: shell globule cluster.

Vitellogenesis is the process of yolk protein formation in the oocytes during sexual maturation. The term vitellogenesis comes from the Latin vitellus ("egg yolk"). Yolk proteins, such as lipovitellin and phosvitin, provides maturing oocytes with the metabolic energy required for development. Vitellogenins are the precursor proteins that lead to yolk protein accumulation in the oocyte. In vertebrates, estrogen and vitellogenin production have a positive correlation. When estrogen production in the ovary is increased via the activation of the hypothalmo-pituitary axis it leads to heightened vitellogenin production in the liver. Vitellogenin production in the liver is the first step of vitellogenesis. Once vitellogenins are released into the blood stream, they are then transported to the growing oocyte, where they lead to yolk protein production. The transport of vitellogenins into the maturing oocyte is done via endocytosis mediated by a receptor, which is a low-density lipoprotein receptor (LDLR). Yolk is a lipoprotein composed of proteins, phospholipids and neutral fats, along with a small amount of glycogen. The yolk is synthesised in the liver of the mother in soluble form. Through circulation it is transported to the follicle cells that surround the maturing ovum and is deposited in the form of yolk platelets and granules in the ooplasm. The mitochondria and Golgi complex are said to bring about the conversion of the soluble form of yolk into insoluble granules or platelets.

The two hormones responsible for vitellogenesis stimulation in insects are sesquiterpenoid juvenile hormone (JH) and ecdysteroid 20-hydroxyecdysone (E20). More recent studies are showing the importance of miRNA in vitellogenesis stimulation as well. The pathways that these hormones regulate is largely dependent on the evolutionary growth of the insect species. Together, JH, E20, and miRNA help synthesize vitellogenins within the fat body. JH uses a JH Methoprene tolerant /Taiman receptor complex that is regulated by JH to synthesis vitellogenins in the fat body.

In cockroaches, for example, vitellogenesis can be stimulated by injection of juvenile hormone into immature females and mature males. In mosquitoes infected with Plasmodium, vitellogenesis may be manipulated by the parasites to reduce fecundity, thereby preserving nutrition in the infected individual.

Summary of the main patterns of yolk accumulation and cleavage in animal embryology (after and).
I. Holoblastic (complete) cleavage	II. Meroblastic (incomplete) cleavage
A. Isolecithal (sparse, evenly distributed yolk): 1. Radial cleavage (echinoderms, hemichordates, amphioxus); 2. Spiral cleavage (annelids, most mollusks, flatworms); 3. Bilateral cleavage (tunicates); 4. Rotational cleavage (placental mammals, nematodes, marsupials [?]); B. Mesolecithal (moderate vegetal yolk disposition): Displaced radial cleavage (amphibians, some fish [the lampreys, gars and bowfins)	A. Telolecithal (dense yolk throughout most of cell): 1. Bilateral cleavage (cephalopod molluscs); 2. Discoidal cleavage (some fish [the hagfishes, chondrichthyans and most teleosts], sauropsids [reptiles and birds], monotremes); B. Centrolecithal (yolk in center of egg): Superficial cleavage (most insects)
