= Egg repair =

Egg repair is the process of repairing the eggshell of a live egg, particularly for live birds as eggs may be damaged by parent birds with sharp claws that can punch holes in a fertilized egg. Eggs are repaired by gluing a piece of another egg of the same shape over the top. Cracked eggs can be repaired by applying white glue. Broken or cracked eggs are likely to be infected by bacteria, followed by death of the embryo. Antiseptic can be used to kill surface bacteria prior to repair.

Birds can also develop from eggs without shells, but the chance of success is around 60% for chickens. A transparent substitute for eggshell made from polydimethylsiloxane allows observation of the growing embryo.
