= Eggshell membrane separation process =

Eggshell membrane separation is a recycling process to separate the protein-rich eggshell membrane from the eggshell.

Nearly 30% of the eggs consumed each year are broken and processed or powdered into foods such as cakes, mixes, mayonnaise, noodles and fast foods. The US food industry generates 150,000 tons of shell waste a year. The disposal methods for waste eggshells are 26.6% as fertilizer, 21.1% as animal feed ingredients, 26.3% discarded in municipal dumps, and 15.8% used in other ways.

Many landfills are unwilling to take the waste because the shells and the attached membrane attract vermin. When unseparated, the calcium carbonate eggshell and protein-rich membrane have little or no value or use; however, the invention of an eggshell and membrane separator has allowed for the recycling of these two products.

== Chemical background ==
Chicken eggshells are made up of 95% calcium carbonate by weight and the remaining material is primarily organic matrix.

Eggshell membrane is primarily composed of fibrous proteins such as collagen type I.

== Methods ==
=== Non-chemical separators ===
==== Scraping ====
Joseph H. MacNeil, Professor of Food Science at Penn State University, developed a machine that uses a delicate multi-bladed knife to scrape the membrane from the surface of shell fragments. This invention uses a water-based method to separate the eggshell and protein membrane. The two products are processed in two streams to yield mm size particles of dry membrane and mm size particles of dried shell.

==== Cyclone ====
Another non-chemical separation technique utilizes steam heat, mechanical abrasion, and a light vacuum to separate the hard eggshell from the protein-containing membranes. This invention passes shell fragments obtained from egg-breaking facilities through a series of heated augers. Once the shell and membrane flakes reach the appropriate moisture content, the vacuum pulls them into a cyclone device. The cyclonic action further separates the heavier eggshell flakes from the lighter membrane flakes. This invention has been commercialized and can easily separate multiple metric tons per day, allowing for the production of valuable products including commercial volumes of natural eggshell membrane or NEM.

==== Venturi ====
Levi New invented a non-chemical and non-thermal separation technique that utilizes airflow to pull egg shells through a venturi. The material is subjected to pressure waves while passing through the venturi. A PulverDryer machine configured with a venturi sized to process egg shell pulverizes the shell component into fine powder and discharges the membrane as an intact dry flake material. The two components are separated in post processing by a standard shaker screen table, then the membrane is cleaned via one of several standard washing processes, depending on end use. Up to several tons of egg shell material can be processed per hour.

==== Dissolved air-flotation separation unit ====
The waste eggshells are put into water and then ground to separate the eggshell from the protein membrane. Then the ground eggshell is placed in a separate vessel where air is injected into the water flow. The air and water mixture causes the lighter component (protein membrane) to float and the heavier (calcium carbonate eggshells) to sink. This unit recovers 96% of eggshell membrane and 99% of eggshell calcium carbonate in two hours.

=== Water and acetic acid ===
The inventor of this method is Vladimir Vlad. The machine uses unseparated eggshells that are placed in a fluid tank, applying cavitation to separate the eggshell membrane from the eggshell. The fluid tank in this case contains distilled water and acetic acid to provide continuous processing. Also this invention has a method for collecting separated eggshells to grind them into an eggshell powder.

== Uses of products ==
Eggshell, as a source of food-safe calcium carbonate, has uses in pharmaceuticals, food, and in general industry.

Eggshell membrane is generally used as a dietary supplement.
