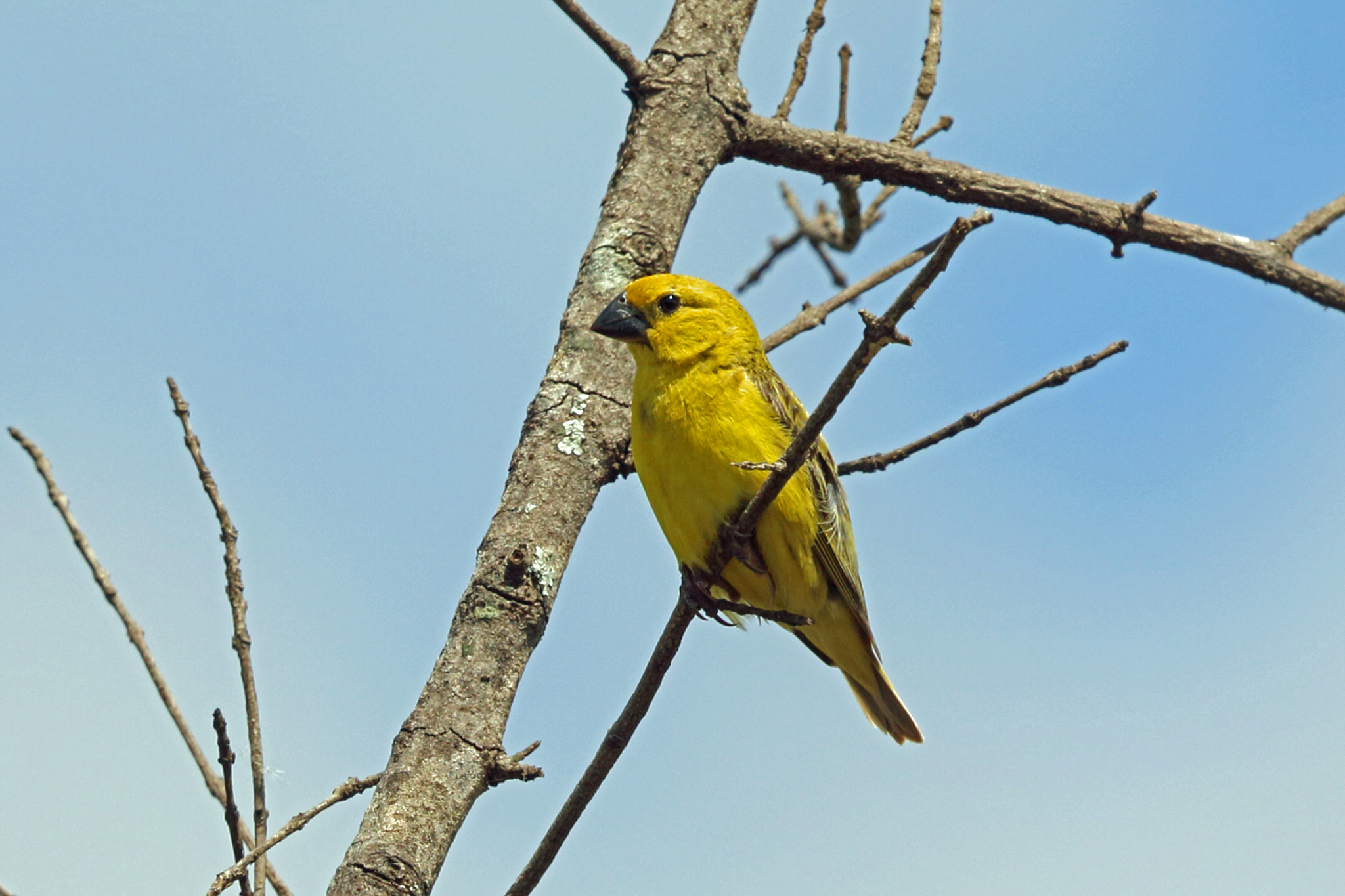
- Male, at Sakania, Katanga, Democratic Republic of the Congo

Conservation status
- Least Concern (IUCN 3.1)

Scientific classification
- Kingdom: Animalia
- Phylum: Chordata
- Class: Aves
- Order: Passeriformes
- Family: Viduidae
- Genus: Anomalospiza; Shelley, 1901
- Species: A. imberbis

Binomial name
- Anomalospiza imberbis (Cabanis, 1868)

Synonyms
- Crithagra imberbis Cabanis, 1868

= Cuckoo-finch =

Species of bird

The cuckoo-finch (Anomalospiza imberbis), also known as the parasitic weaver or cuckoo weaver, is a small passerine bird now placed in the family Viduidae with the indigobirds and whydahs. It occurs in grassland in Africa south of the Sahara. The male is mainly yellow and green while the female is buff with dark streaks. They lay their eggs in the nests of other birds.

== Taxonomy ==
The species was described in 1868 by the German ornithologist Jean Cabanis based on a specimen from East Africa, probably from the coast opposite Zanzibar. It was initially placed in the genus Crithagra but later moved to a genus of its own, Anomalospiza. The name of the genus means "anomalous finch" with spiza being a Greek word for finch. The specific name imberbis comes from Latin and means "beardless".

Its closest relatives are thought to be the indigobirds and whydahs of the genus Vidua. These birds are now usually considered to form a family, Viduidae. Previously they were treated as a subfamily, Viduinae, within either the estrildid finch family Estrildidae, or the weaver family Ploceidae.

== Description ==
The cuckoo-finch is a small finch-like bird, about 11–13 cm long. It has a short tail, large legs and feet, and a large, deep, conical bill. The adult male has a black bill and a yellow head and underparts. The upperparts are olive-green with black streaks. The yellow areas become increasingly bright prior to the breeding season as the feathers become worn. The adult female is buff with heavy black streaking above and light streaks on the flanks; its face is largely plain buff and the throat is buff-white. It has various chattering calls. Displaying males have a nasal song.

== Distribution and habitat ==
The cuckoo-finch has a scattered distribution across sub-Saharan Africa where it occurs in open or lightly wooded grassland, especially near damp areas.

In West Africa, it occurs in Guinea, Sierra Leone, the Ivory Coast, Ghana, Togo, Benin, eastern Nigeria, and north-west Cameroon with vagrant records from Gambia and Mali. Further east it is found in South Sudan, Ethiopia, Uganda, Kenya, Tanzania, Rwanda, Burundi, southern and eastern parts of the Democratic Republic of the Congo and locally in the Republic of the Congo. In southern Africa, it occurs in Malawi, Zambia, southern and eastern Angola, north-east Namibia, northern and eastern Botswana, Zimbabwe, Mozambique, eastern South Africa, and Eswatini.

It has a large range and an apparently stable population and so is classified as least concern by BirdLife International.

== Behaviour ==
The cuckoo-finch typically occurs in pairs or small flocks during the breeding season and larger flocks outside the breeding season. It forages on the ground or perched on the flower heads of grasses or herbs. It feeds mainly on grass seeds.

The species is an obligate brood parasite, laying its eggs in the nests of cisticolas and prinias. The eggs are white, pale blue or pink with brown, reddish or violet markings. They are 17–17.3 mm long and 12.5–13 mm wide. The eggs are incubated for 14 days. The young bird fledges after 18 days and remains dependent on its hosts for another 10–40 days. The young of the host bird usually disappear although there have been records of the host's nestlings surviving alongside the young cuckoo-finch. Sometimes two cuckoo-finch chicks have been found in the same nest.

== Gallery ==
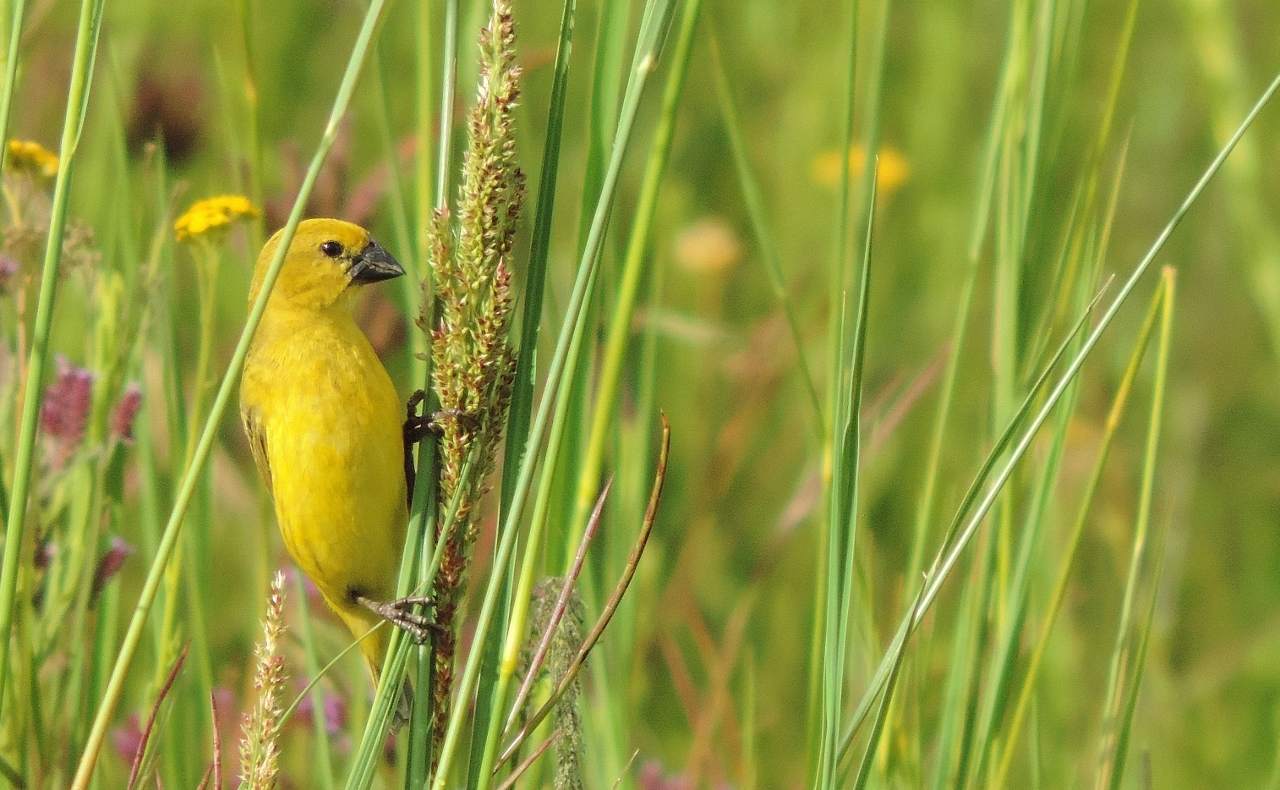
Male, near Harare, Zimbabwe

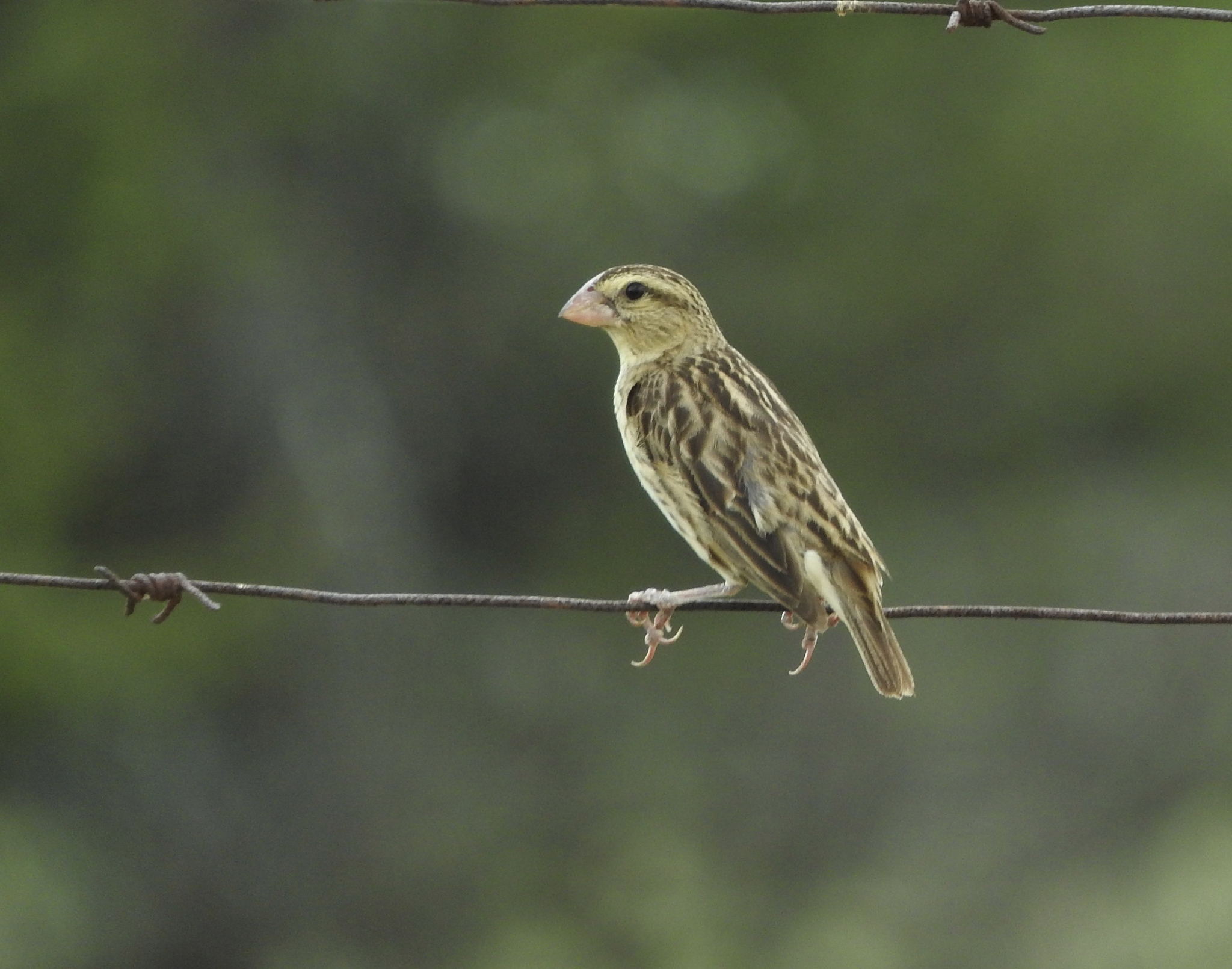
Female, Pilanesberg National Park, South Africa

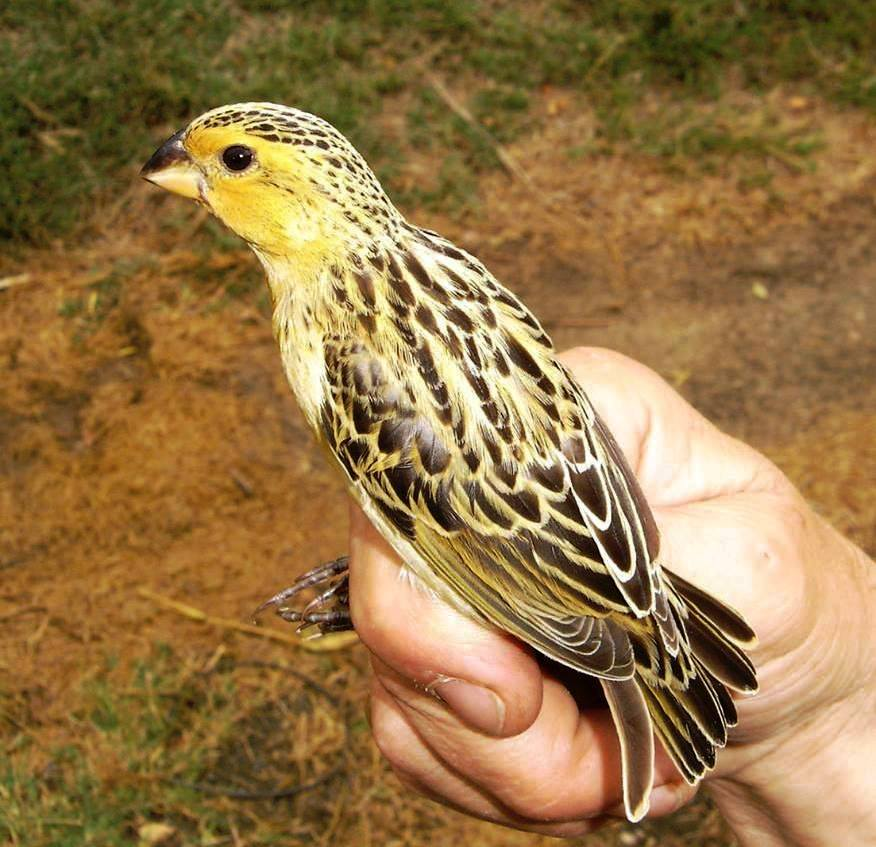
Trapped female bird at Polokwane, Limpopo

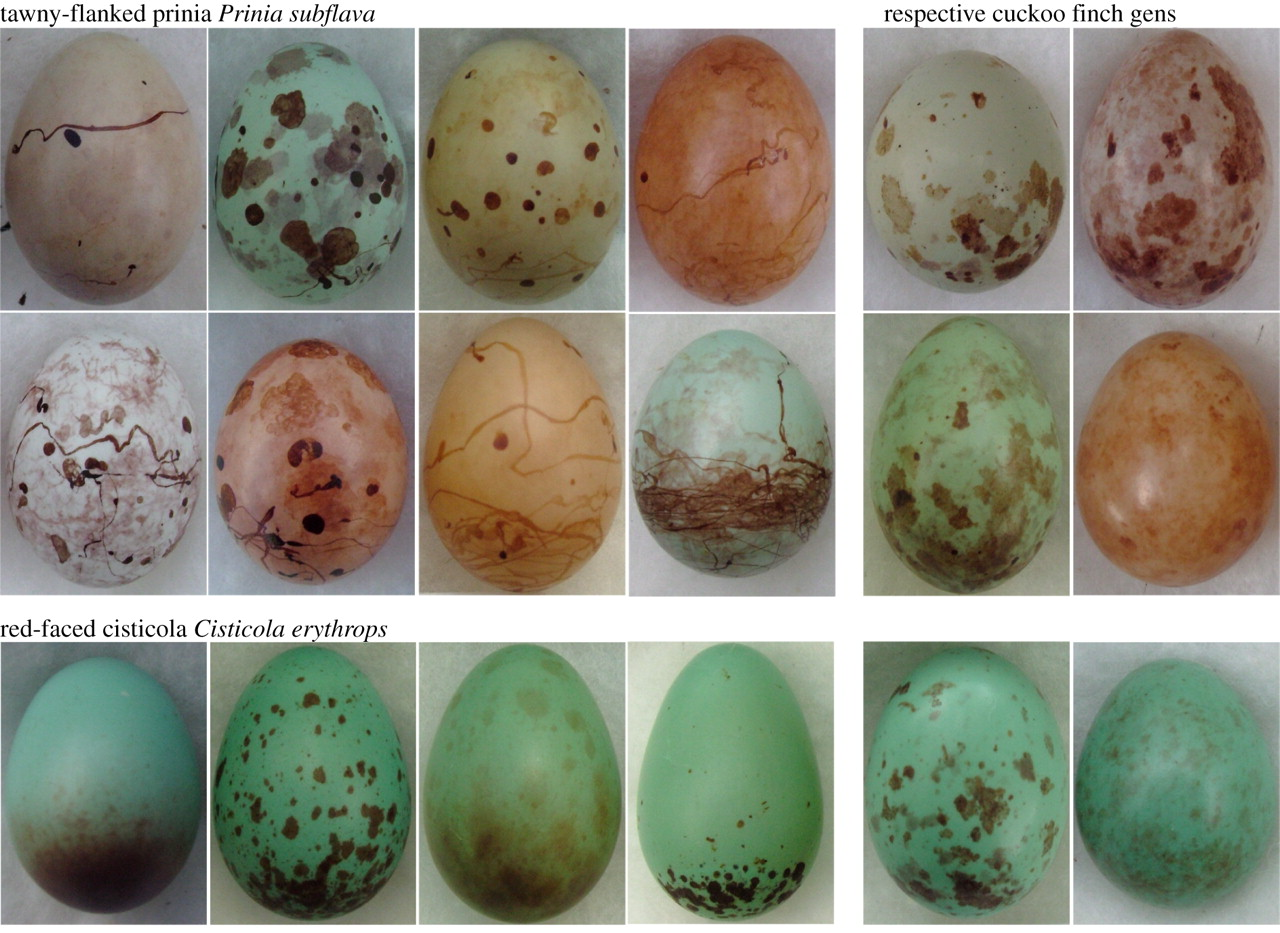
Cuckoo-finch eggs (right two columns) closely resemble the eggs of their host species (tawny-flanked prinia and red-faced cisticola shown).
