= Eggshell =

Protective exterior of an egg

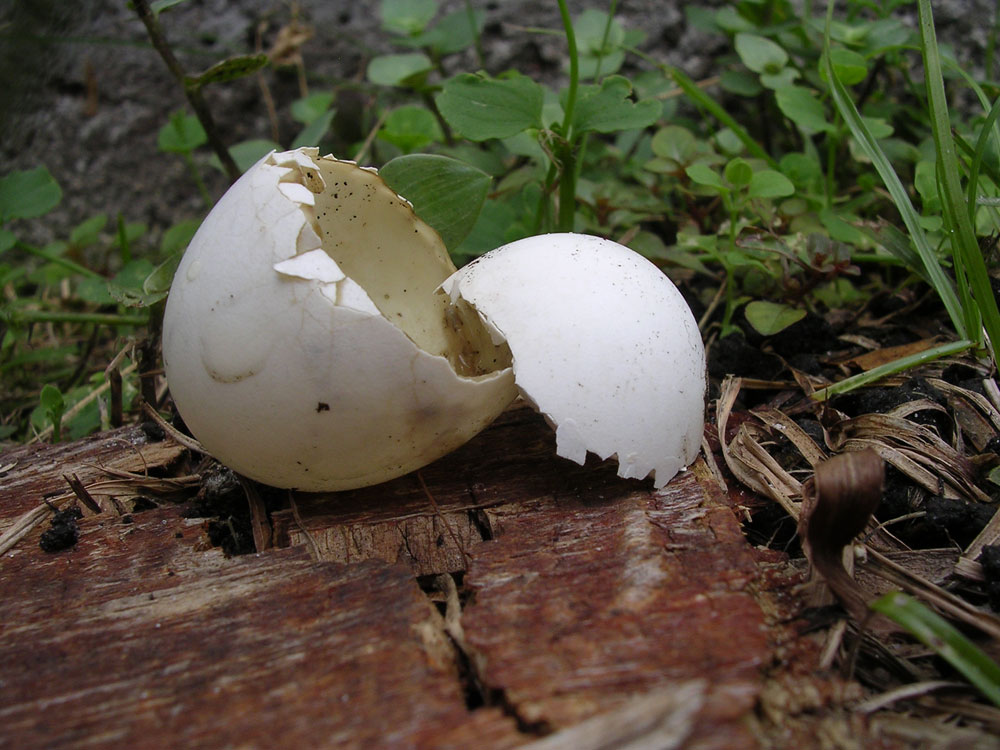
A broken wild bird eggshell

An eggshell is the outer covering of a hard-shelled egg and of some forms of eggs with soft outer cots.

== Worm eggs ==
Nematode eggs present a two-layered structure: an external vitellin layer made of chitin that confers mechanical resistance and an internal lipid-rich layer that makes the egg chamber impermeable.

== Insect eggs ==
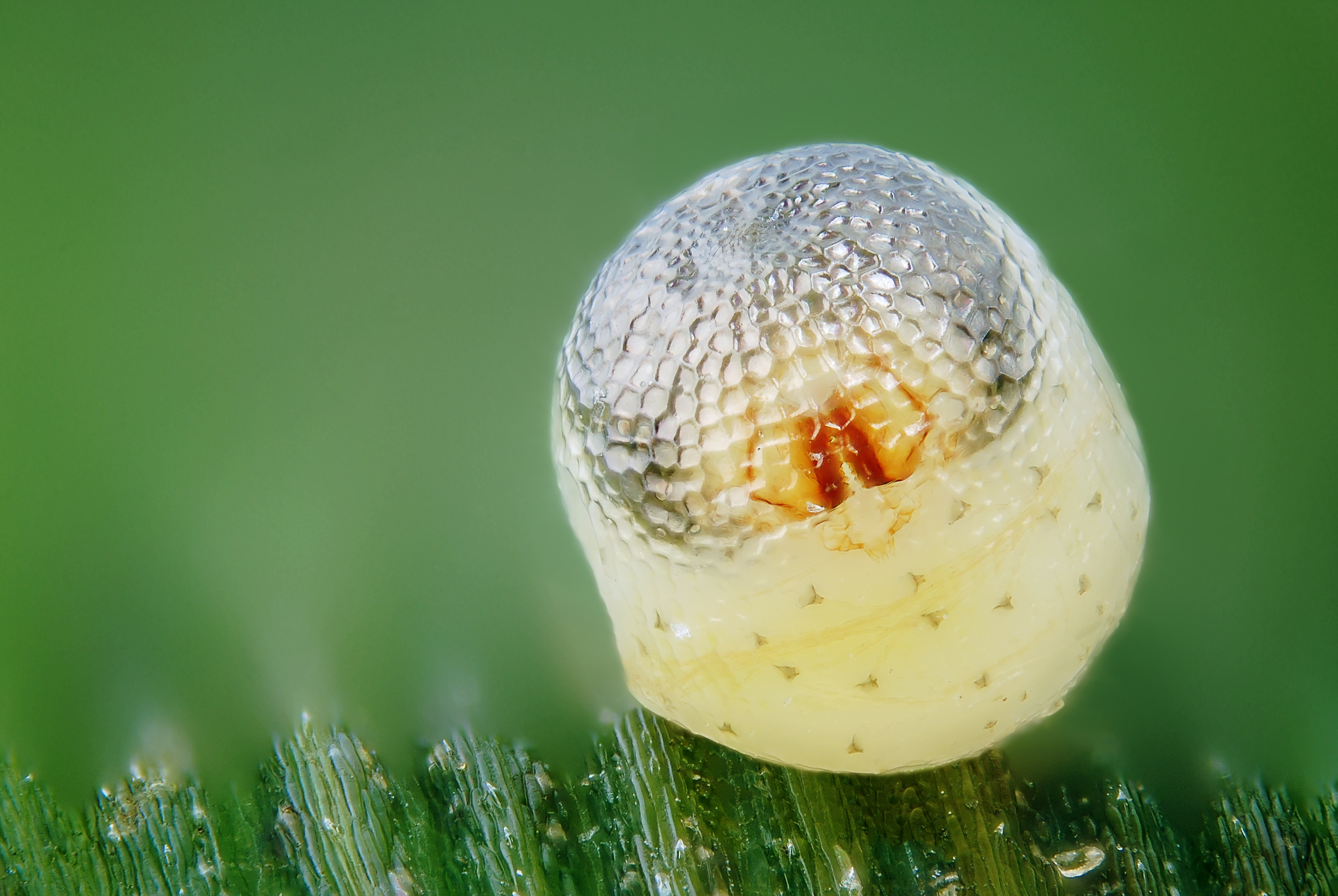
Butterfly embryo / caterpillar visible through transparent eggshell

Insects and other arthropods lay a large variety of styles and shapes of eggs. Some of them have gelatinous or skin-like coverings, others have hard eggshells. Softer shells are mostly protein. It may be fibrous or quite liquid. Some arthropod eggs do not actually have shells, rather, their outer covering is actually the outermost embryonic membrane, the choroid, which protects inner layers. This can be a complex structure, and it may have different layers, including an outermost layer called an exochorion. Eggs which must survive in dry conditions usually have hard eggshells, made mostly of dehydrated or mineralized proteins with pore systems to allow respiration. Arthropod eggs can have extensive ornamentation on their outer surfaces.

== Fish, amphibian and reptile eggs ==
Fish and amphibians generally lay eggs which are surrounded by the extraembryonic membranes but do not develop a shell, hard or soft, around these membranes. Some fish and amphibian eggs have thick, leathery coats, especially if they must withstand physical force or desiccation. These types of eggs can also be very small and fragile.

While many reptiles lay eggs with flexible, calcified eggshells, there are some that lay hard eggs. Eggs laid by snakes generally have leathery shells which often adhere to one another. Depending on the species, turtles and tortoises lay hard or soft eggs. Several species lay eggs which are nearly indistinguishable from bird eggs.

== Bird eggs ==
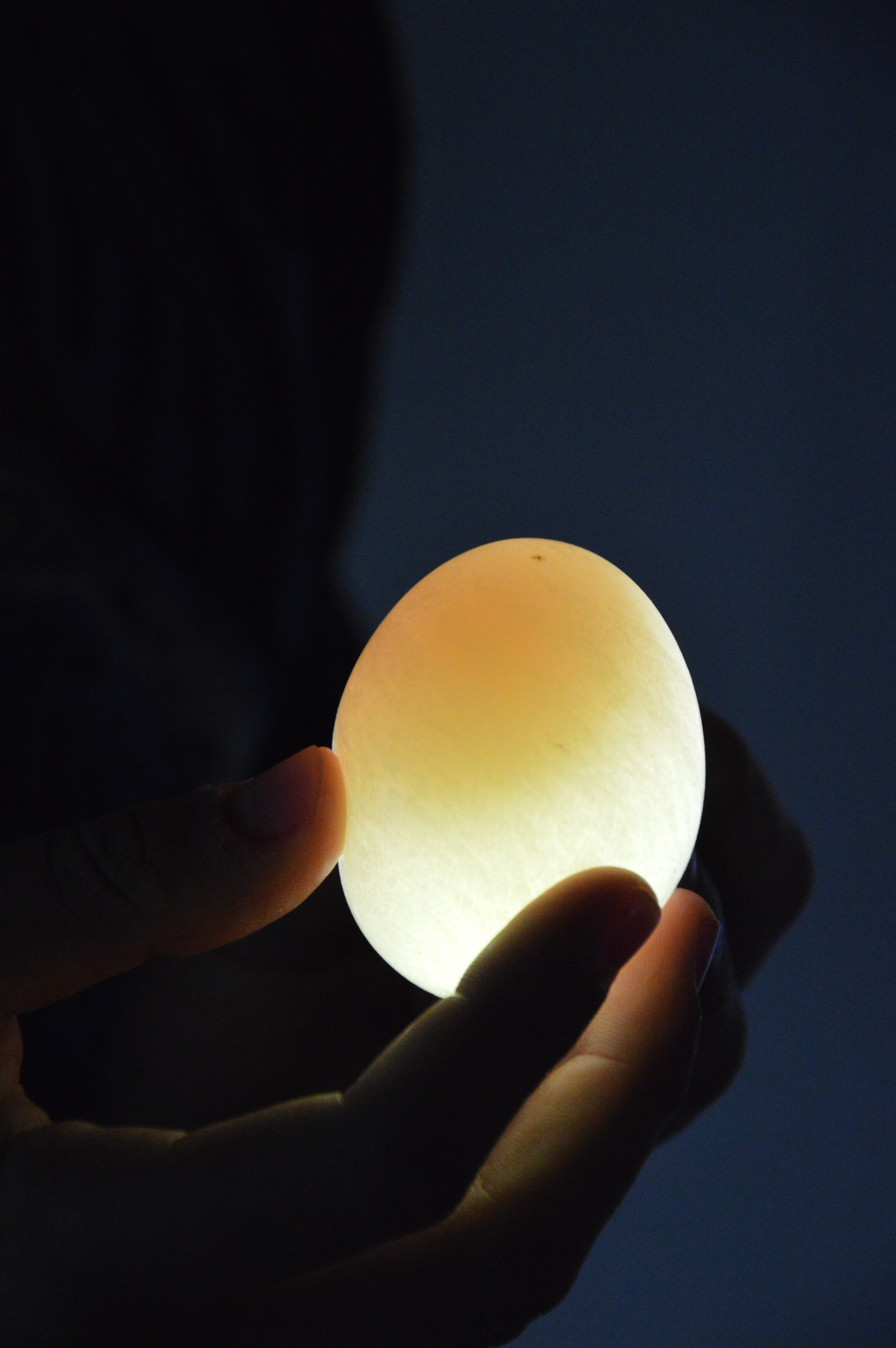
This chicken egg has been soaked in vinegar for a few days and has become translucent and flexible.

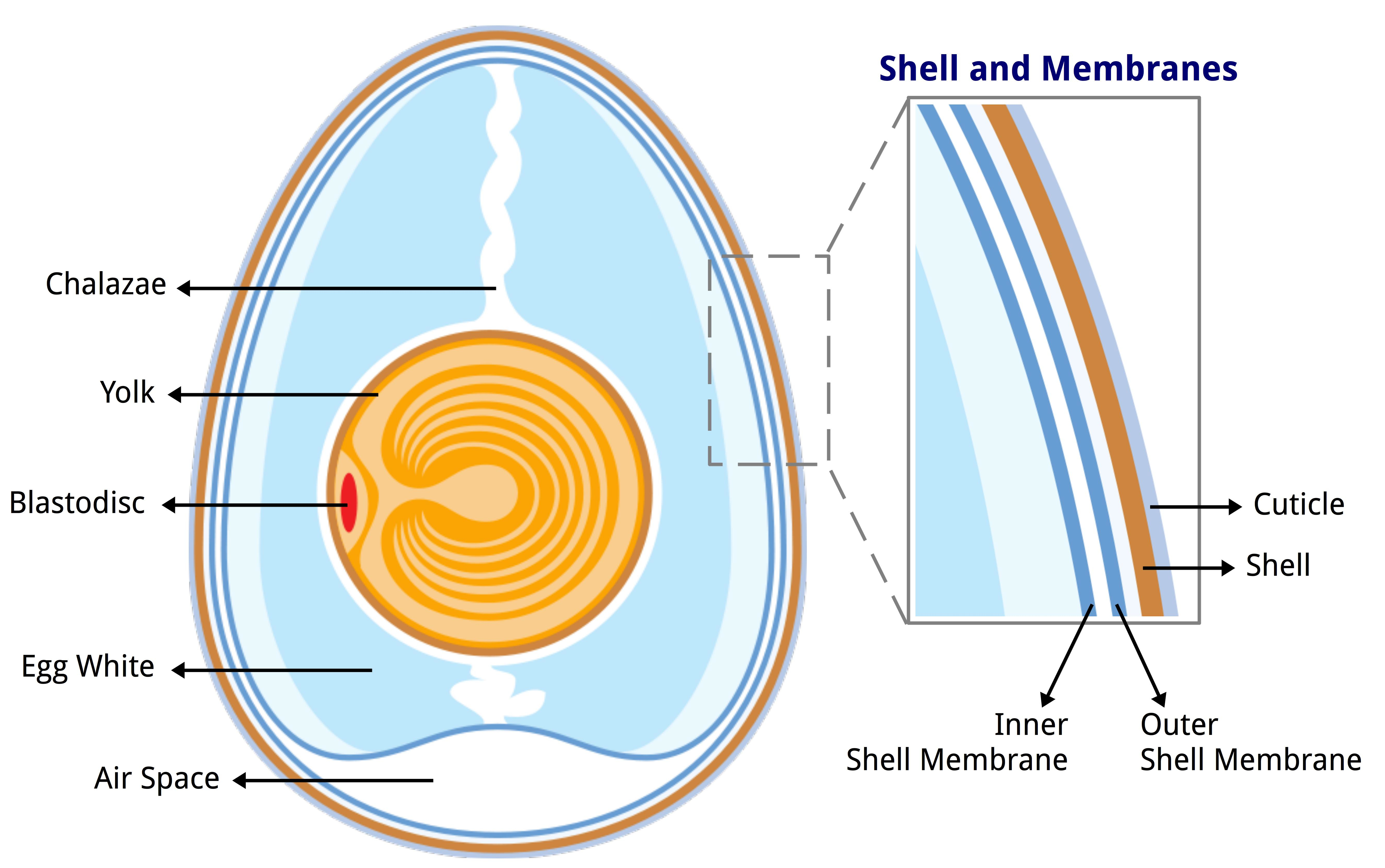
Anatomy of a chicken egg.

The bird egg is a fertilized gamete (or, in the case of some birds, such as chickens, possibly unfertilized) located on the yolk surface and surrounded by albumen, or egg white. The albumen in turn is surrounded by two shell membranes (inner and outer membranes) and then the eggshell. The chicken eggshell is 95-97% calcium carbonate crystals, which are stabilized by a protein matrix. Without the protein, the crystal structure would be too brittle to keep its form and the organic matrix is thought to have a role in deposition of calcium during the mineralization process. The structure and composition of the avian eggshell protects the egg from damage and microbial contamination, prevents desiccation, regulates embryonic gas and water exchange and provides calcium for embryogenesis. Eggshell formation requires gram amounts of calcium being deposited within hours, which must be supplied via the hen's diet. The avian eggshell is constructed from an organized assembly of mineral nanoparticles whose size confers different hardness properties to different regions of the shell. Specific matrix proteins such as ovocleidin-116 and ovocalyxin-32 play crucial roles in regulating calcite crystal growth and orientation during shell formation, directly influencing shell strength.

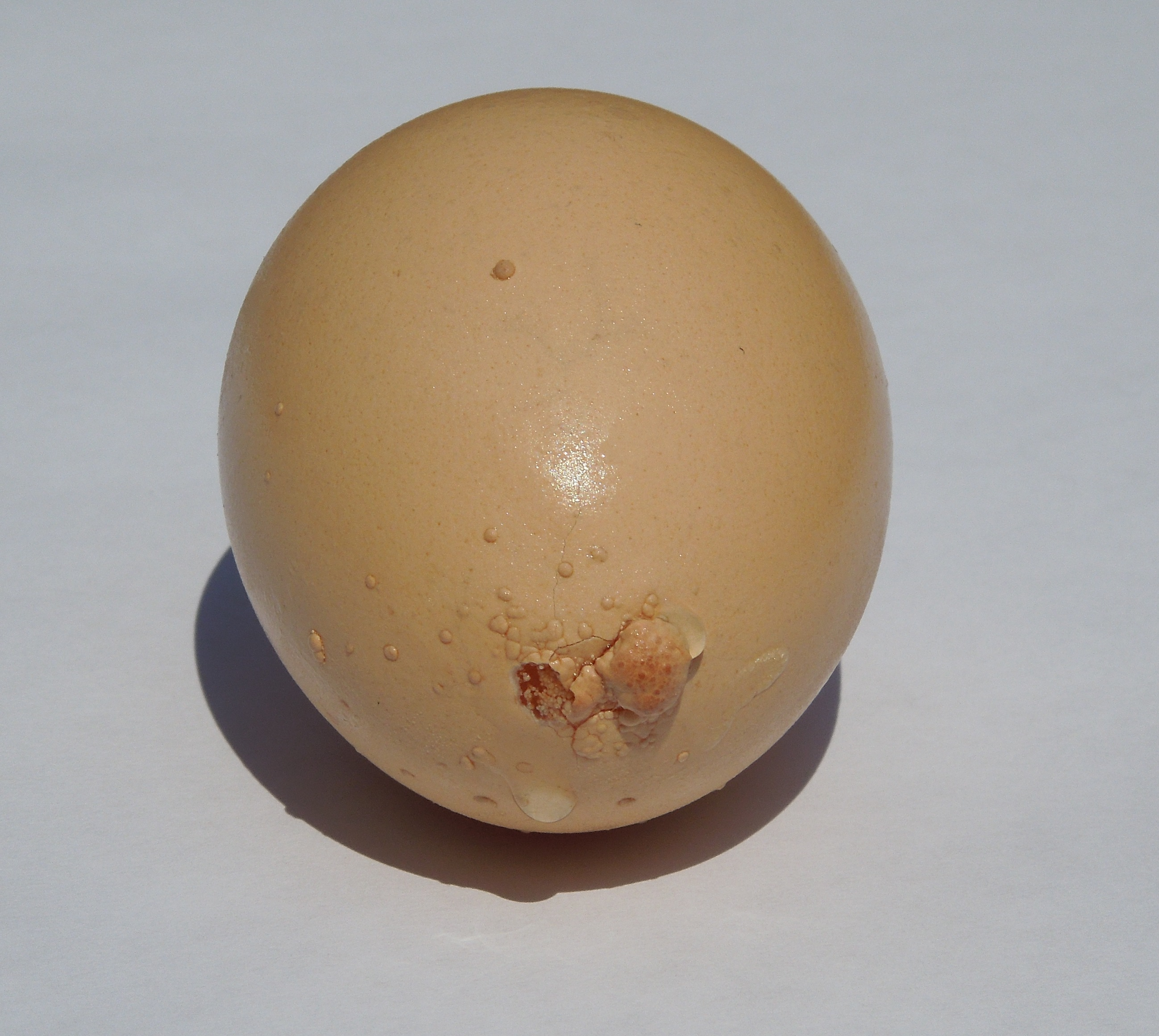
Chicken egg with irregular calcification

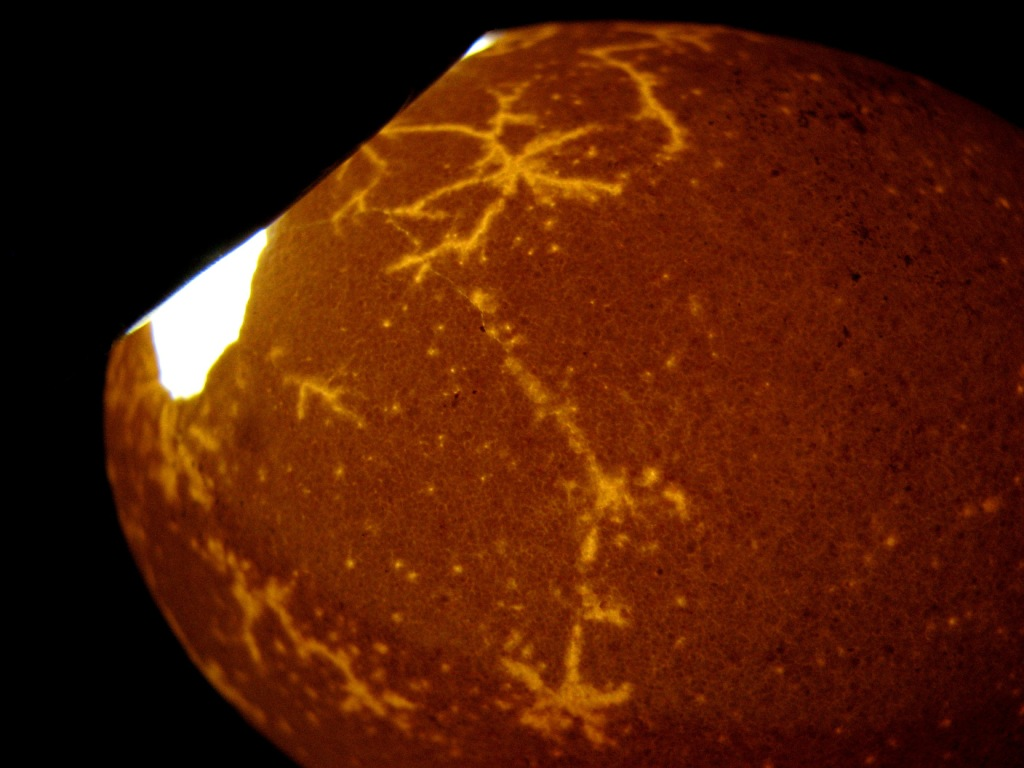
Structure revealed by light

The fibrous chicken shell membranes are added in the proximal (white) isthmus of the oviduct. In the distal (red) isthmus mammillae or mammillary knobs are deposited on the surface of the outer membrane in a regular array pattern. The mammillae are proteoglycan-rich and are thought to control calcification. In the shell gland (similar to a mammalian uterus), mineralization starts at the mammillae and around the outermost membrane fibers. The shell gland fluid contains very high levels of calcium and bicarbonate ions. The thick calcified layer of the eggshell forms in columns from the mammillae structures, and is known as the palisade layer. Between these palisade columns are narrow pores that traverse the eggshell and allow gaseous exchange. The cuticle forms the final, outer layer of the eggshell. Attachment of the soft organic fibrous membrane to the hard calcite shell is essential for proper chick embryonic development and growth (via ensuring association of the chorioallantoic membrane, and in allowing for air-sac formation at the blunt end of the egg). This attachment between dissimilar materials is facilitated by a structural interdigitation of fibers into each mammillae at the microscale, and reciprocally, at the nanoscale, mineral spiking into fibers directly at the interface

While the bulk of eggshell is made of calcium carbonate, it is now thought that the protein matrix has an important role to play in eggshell strength. These proteins affect crystallization, which in turn affects the eggshell structure. The concentration of eggshell proteins decreases over the life of the laying hen, as does eggshell strength.

In an average laying hen, the process of shell formation takes around 20 hours. Pigmentation is added to the shell by papillae lining the oviduct, coloring it any of a variety of colors and patterns depending on species. Since eggs are usually laid blunt end first, that end is subjected to most pressure during its passage and consequently shows the most color.

As they contain mainly calcium carbonate, bird eggshells dissolve in various acids, including the vinegar used in cooking. While dissolving, the calcium carbonate in an eggshell reacts with the acid to form carbon dioxide.

=== Environmental issues ===
The US food industry generates 150,000 tons of shell waste per year. The disposal methods for waste eggshells are 26.6% as fertilizer, 21.1% as animal feed ingredients, 26.3% discarded in municipal dumps, and 15.8% used in other ways. Some landfills do not take the waste because the shells and the attached membrane attract vermin. When unseparated, the calcium carbonate eggshell and protein-rich membrane are useless. Recent inventions have allowed for the egg cracking industry to separate the eggshell from the eggshell membrane. The eggshell is mostly made up of calcium carbonate and the membrane is valuable protein. When separated both products have an array of uses.

== Mammal eggs ==
Monotremes, egg-laying mammals, lay soft-shelled eggs similar to those of reptiles. The shell is deposited on the egg in layers within the uterus. The egg can take up fluids and grow in size during this process, and the final, most rigid layer is not added until the egg is full-size.

== Egg teeth ==
Hatching birds, amphibian and egg-laying reptiles have an egg-tooth used to start an exit hole in the hard eggshell.

== Uses ==
=== Chemicals ===
Because of their calcium carbonate content, waste eggshells have the potential to be used as raw material in the production of lime.

=== Pharmaceuticals ===
The rich calcium carbonate shell has been used in the application for calcium deficiency therapies in humans and animals. A single eggshell has a mass of six grams which yields around 2200 mg of calcium (6000 mg × 0.95 × 0.4= 2280 mg). Eggshell particles are used in toothpaste as an anti-tartar agent. Powdered eggshells have been used for bone mineralization and growth.

=== Food ===
Recent applications of eggshells include producing calcium lactate as a firming agent, a flavor enhancer, a leavening agent, a nutrient supplement, a stabilizer, and thickener. Eggshells are also used as a calcium supplement in orange juice.

=== Other ===
Eggshells have been incorporated into fertilizers as a soil conditioner. They have also been used as a supplement to animal feed. More recently the egg calcium carbonate particles have been used as coating pigments for ink-jet printing. Powdered eggshells are also used in making paper pulp. Recently eggshell waste has been used as a low cost catalyst for biodiesel production. Chicken eggshells have been additionally incorporated as a calcium precursor into the synthesis of calcium-based metal-organic frameworks (MOFs).

Recently, researchers have utilized chicken eggshells as a biofiller with a conducting polymer to enhance its sensing properties. Typically, eggshells were used as biofiller in polyaniline matrix to detect ammonia gas. The optimum ratio between eggshells and polyaniline could enhance this sensor measurement.

Ostrich eggshells have been used by Sub Saharan hunter-gathers. For instance the Juǀʼhoansi have used them to carry water and create beads from them.

== See also ==
- Eggshell skull rule, in tort law
- Walk on eggshells, an idiom in the English language
- Eggshell membrane, a dietary supplement
- En-caul birth
