= Eggshell membrane =

Membrane of avian eggshells

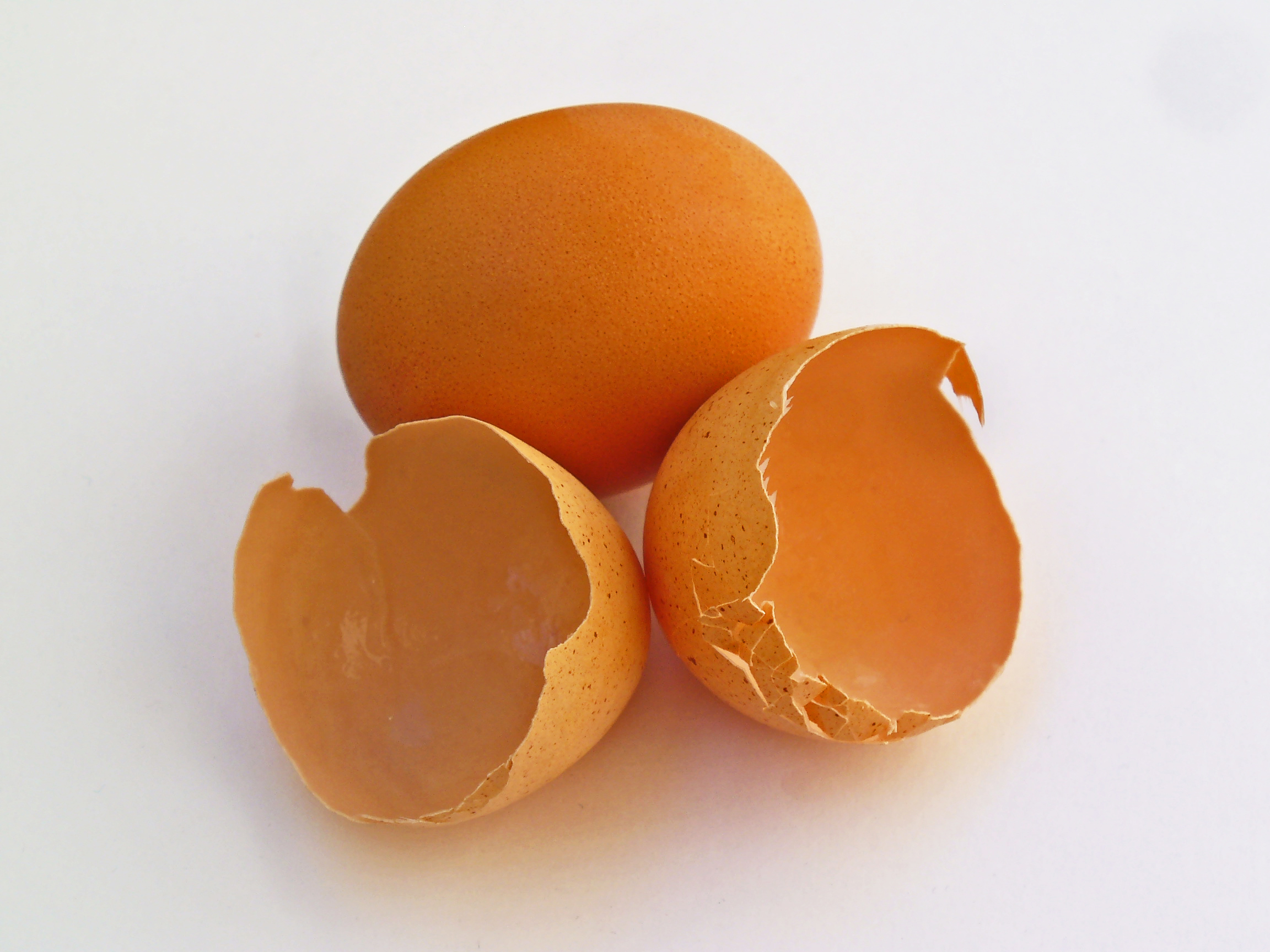
Eggshell membrane is the clear film lining the chicken eggshell displayed

Eggshell membrane or shell membrane is the clear film lining eggshells, visible when one peels a boiled bird egg. Chicken eggshell membranes are used as a dietary supplement.

Eggshell membrane is derived commercially from the eggshells of industrial processors. In the United States, egg-breaking facilities generate more than 24 billion broken eggshells every year. There are various ways in which the membrane is separated from the shell, including chemical, mechanical, steam, and vacuum processes. Attachment of the soft organic fibrous membrane to the hard calcite shell is essential for proper chick embryonic development and growth (via ensuring association of the chorioallantoic membrane, and in allowing for air-sac formation at the blunt end of the egg). This attachment between dissimilar materials is facilitated by a structural interdigitation of fibers into each mammillae at the microscale, and reciprocally, at the nanoscale, mineral spiking into fibers directly at the interface

== Composition ==
Eggshell membrane is primarily composed of fibrous proteins such as collagen type I. Eggshell membranes also contain glycosaminoglycans, such as dermatan sulfate, chondroitin sulfate, and sulfated glycoproteins including hexosamines, such as glucosamine. Other components identified in eggshell membranes are hyaluronic acid, sialic acid, desmosine, isodesmosine, ovotransferrin, lysyl oxidase, lysozyme, and β-N-acetylglucosaminidase.

== Uses ==
Shell membrane is mainly used as a dietary supplement in a partially hydrolyzed powder form.
