= Centrolecithal =

Centrolecithal (Greek kentron = center of a circle, lekithos = yolk) describes the placement of the yolk in the centre of the cytoplasm of ova. Many arthropod eggs are centrolecithal.

During cytokinesis, centrolecithal zygotes undergo meroblastic cleavage, where the cleavage plane extends only to the accumulated yolk and is superficial. This is due to the large dense yolk found within centrolecithal eggs and triggers a delayed embryonic development.

== See also ==
- Cell cycle
- Isolecithal
- Telolecithal
