= Isolecithal =

Even distribution of yolk in the cytoplasm of ova

Isolecithal (Greek iso = equal, lekithos = yolk) refers to the even distribution of yolk in the cytoplasm of ova of mammals and other vertebrates, notably fishes of the families Petromyzontidae, Amiidae, and Lepisosteidae. Isolecithal cells have two equal hemispheres of yolk. However, during cellular development, normally under the influence of gravity, some of the yolk settles to the bottom of the egg, producing an uneven distribution of yolky hemispheres. Such uneven cells are known as telolecithal and are common where there is sufficient yolk mass.

In the absence of a large concentration of yolk, four major cleavage types can be observed in isolecithal cells: radial holoblastic, spiral holoblastic, bilateral holoblastic, and rotational holoblastic cleavage. These holoblastic cleavage planes pass all the way through isolecithal zygotes during the process of cytokinesis. Coeloblastula is the next stage of development for eggs that undergo this radial cleavage. In mammals, because the isolecithal cells have only a small amount of yolk, they require immediate implantation onto the uterine wall to receive nutrients.

== See also ==
- Cell cycle
- Centrolecithal
- Telolecithal
