= Telolecithal =

Telolecithal (Greek: τέλος (telos) = end, λέκιθος (lekithos) = yolk), refers to the uneven distribution of yolk in the cytoplasm of ova found in birds, reptiles, fish, and monotremes. The yolk is concentrated at one pole of the egg, separate from the developing embryo.

This type of egg undergoes discoidal meroblastic cleavage, where yolk is not incorporated into the cells during cell division.

== See also ==
- Centrolecithal
- Isolecithal
