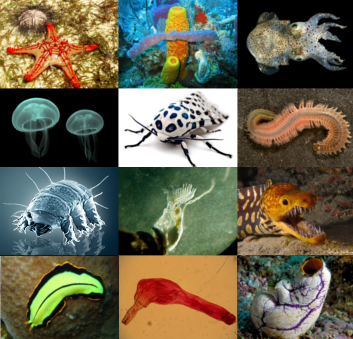

Scientific classification
- Domain: Eukaryota
- Clade: Podiata
- Supergroup: Amorphea
- Clade: Obazoa
- Clade: Opisthokonta
- Clade: Holozoa
- Clade: Filozoa
- Clade: Choanozoa
- Kingdom: Animalia; Linnaeus, 1758

Major groups
- Bilateria (~30 phyla); Cnidaria; Ctenophora; Placozoa; Porifera

Synonyms
- Metazoa Haeckel, 1874

= Animal =

Animals Temporal range: Cryogenian – present, 665–0 Ma

Biological kingdom

Animals are multicellular, eukaryotic organisms belonging to the biological kingdom Animalia (/ˌænɪˈmeɪliə/). Animals consume organic material, breathe oxygen, have muscle cells, can reproduce sexually, and grow from a hollow sphere of cells, the blastula, during embryonic development. With few exceptions, animals are able to move. Animals form a clade, meaning that they arose from a single common ancestor. Over 1.5 million living animal species have been described, of which around 1.05 million are insects, over 85,000 are molluscs, and around 65,000 are vertebrates. It has been estimated there are as many as 7.77 million animal species on Earth. Animal body lengths range from 8.5 μm (0.00033 in) to 33.6 m (110 ft). They have complex ecologies and interactions with each other and their environments, forming intricate food webs. The scientific study of animals is known as zoology, and the study of animal behaviour is known as ethology.

The animal kingdom is divided into five major clades, namely Porifera, Ctenophora, Placozoa, Cnidaria and Bilateria. Most living animal species belong to the clade Bilateria, a highly proliferative clade whose members have a bilaterally symmetric and significantly cephalised body plan, and the vast majority of bilaterians belong to two large clades: the protostomes, which include organisms such as arthropods, molluscs, flatworms, annelids and nematodes; and the deuterostomes, which include echinoderms, hemichordates and chordates, the last of which contains the vertebrates. The much smaller basal phylum Xenacoelomorpha have an uncertain position within Bilateria.

Animals are first represented in the fossil record in the Ediacaran period, with most modern animal phyla appearing as marine species in the Cambrian explosion, which began around 539 million years ago (Mya), and most classes during the Ordovician radiation 485.4 Mya. Common to all living animals, 6,331 groups of genes have been identified that may have arisen from a single common ancestor that lived about 650 Mya during the Cryogenian period.

Historically, Aristotle divided animals into those with blood and those without. Carl Linnaeus created the first hierarchical biological classification for animals in 1758 with his Systema Naturae, which Jean-Baptiste Lamarck expanded into 14 phyla by 1809. In 1874, Ernst Haeckel divided the animal kingdom into the multicellular Metazoa (now synonymous with Animalia) and the Protozoa, single-celled organisms no longer considered animals. In modern times, the biological classification of animals relies on advanced techniques, such as molecular phylogenetics, which are effective at demonstrating the evolutionary relationships between taxa.

Humans make use of many other animal species for food (including meat, eggs, and dairy products), for materials (such as leather, fur, and wool), as pets and as working animals for transportation, and services. Dogs, the first domesticated animal, have been used in hunting, in security and in warfare, as have horses, pigeons and birds of prey; while other terrestrial and aquatic animals are hunted for sports, trophies or profits. Non-human animals are also an important element of human culture, having appeared in cave arts and totems since the earliest times, and are frequently featured in mythology, religion, arts, literature, heraldry, politics, and sports.

== Etymology ==
The word animal comes from the Latin noun animal of the same meaning, which is itself derived from Latin animalis 'having breath or soul'. The biological definition includes all members of the kingdom Animalia. In colloquial usage, the term animal is often used to refer only to nonhuman animals. The term metazoa is derived from Ancient Greek μετα meta 'after' (in biology, the prefix meta- stands for 'later') and ζῷᾰ zōia 'animals', plural of ζῷον zōion 'animal'. A metazoan is any member of the group Metazoa.

== Characteristics ==
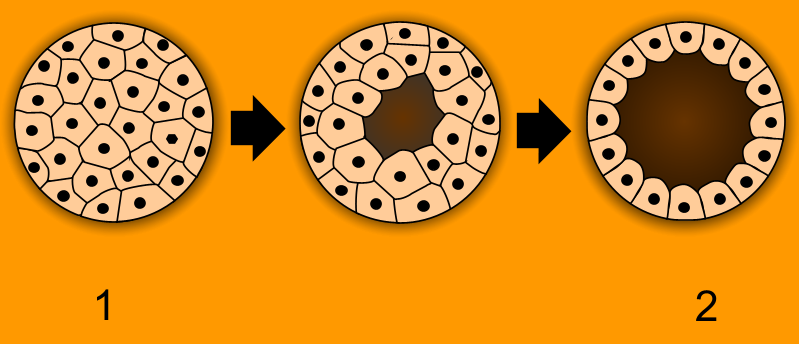
Animals are unique in having the ball of cells of the early embryo (1) develop into a hollow ball or blastula (2).

Animals have several characteristics that they share with other living things. Animals are eukaryotic, multicellular, and aerobic, as are plants and fungi. Unlike plants and algae, which produce their own food, animals cannot produce their own food, a feature they share with fungi. Animals ingest organic material and digest it internally.

=== Structural features ===
Animals have structural characteristics that set them apart from all other living things, such as cells being surrounded by an extracellular matrix composed of collagen and elastic glycoproteins, motility to spontaneously move their bodies during at least part of their life cycle, and a blastula stage during embryonic development.

Typically, there is an internal digestive chamber with either one opening (in Ctenophora, Cnidaria, and flatworms) or two openings (in most bilaterians).

=== Development ===
Development in Bilateria and Cnidaria is controlled by Hox genes, which signal the times and places to develop structures such as body segments and limbs.

During development, the animal extracellular matrix forms a relatively flexible framework upon which cells can move about and be reorganised into specialised tissues and organs, making the formation of complex structures possible, and allowing cells to be differentiated. The extracellular matrix may be calcified, forming structures such as shells, bones, and spicules. In contrast, the cells of other multicellular organisms (primarily algae, plants, and fungi) are held in place by cell walls, and so develop by progressive growth.

=== Reproduction ===
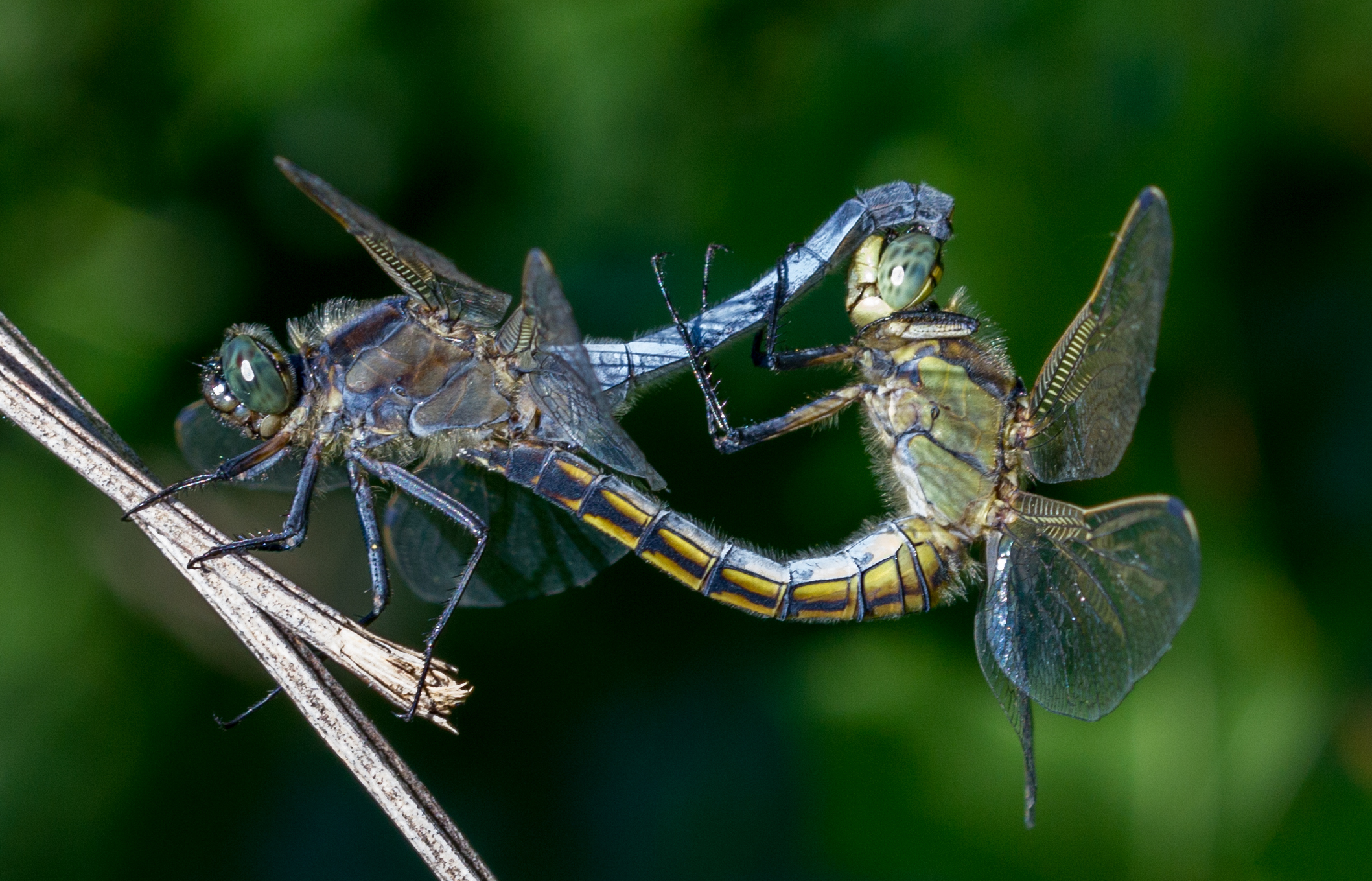
Sexual reproduction is nearly universal in animals, such as these dragonflies.

Nearly all animals make use of some form of sexual reproduction. They produce haploid gametes by meiosis; the smaller, motile gametes are spermatozoa and the larger, non-motile gametes are ova. These fuse to form zygotes, which develop via mitosis into a hollow sphere, called a blastula. In sponges, blastula larvae swim to a new location, attach to the seabed, and develop into a new sponge. In most other groups, the blastula undergoes more complicated rearrangement. It first invaginates to form a gastrula with a digestive chamber and two separate germ layers, an external ectoderm and an internal endoderm. In most cases, a third germ layer, the mesoderm, also develops between them. These germ layers then differentiate to form tissues and organs.

Repeated instances of mating with a close relative during sexual reproduction generally leads to inbreeding depression within a population due to the increased prevalence of harmful recessive traits. Animals have evolved numerous mechanisms for avoiding close inbreeding.

Some animals are capable of asexual reproduction, which often results in a genetic clone of the parent. This may take place through fragmentation; budding, such as in Hydra and other cnidarians; or parthenogenesis, where fertile eggs are produced without mating, such as in aphids.

== Ecology ==
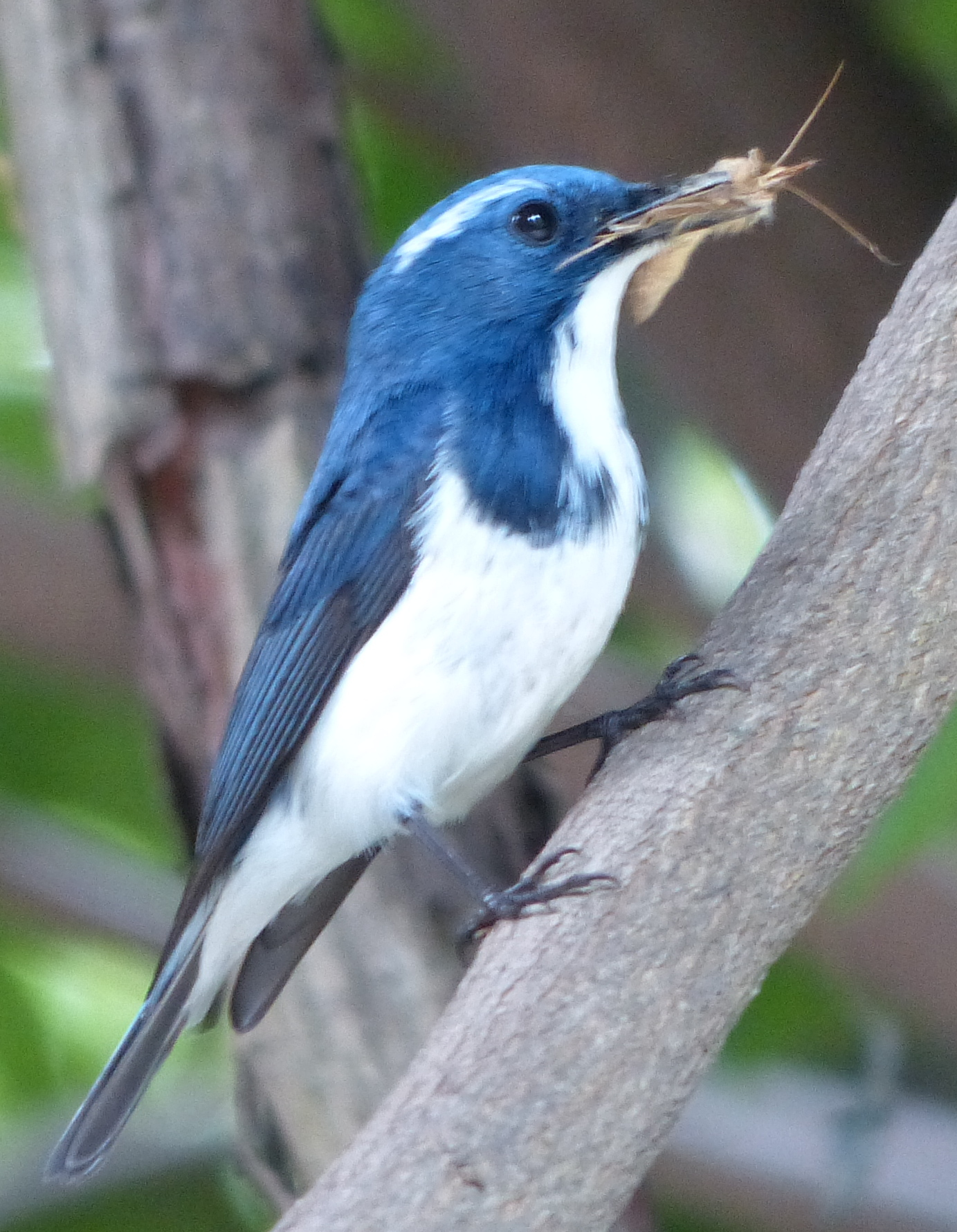
Predators, such as this ultramarine flycatcher (Ficedula superciliaris), feed on other animals.

Animals are categorised into ecological groups depending on their trophic levels and how they consume organic material. Such groupings include carnivores (further divided into subcategories such as piscivores, insectivores, ovivores, etc.), herbivores (subcategorised into folivores, graminivores, frugivores, granivores, nectarivores, algivores, etc.), omnivores, fungivores, scavengers/detritivores, and parasites.

Interactions between animals of each biome form complex food webs within that ecosystem. In carnivorous or omnivorous species, predation is a consumer–resource interaction where the predator feeds on another organism, its prey, who often evolves anti-predator adaptations to avoid being fed upon. Selective pressures imposed on one another lead to an evolutionary arms race between predator and prey, resulting in various antagonistic/competitive coevolutions. Almost all multicellular predators are animals. Some consumers use multiple methods; for example, in parasitoid wasps, the larvae feed on the hosts' living tissues, killing them in the process, but the adults primarily consume nectar from flowers. Other animals may have very specific feeding behaviours, such as hawksbill sea turtles which mainly eat sponges.

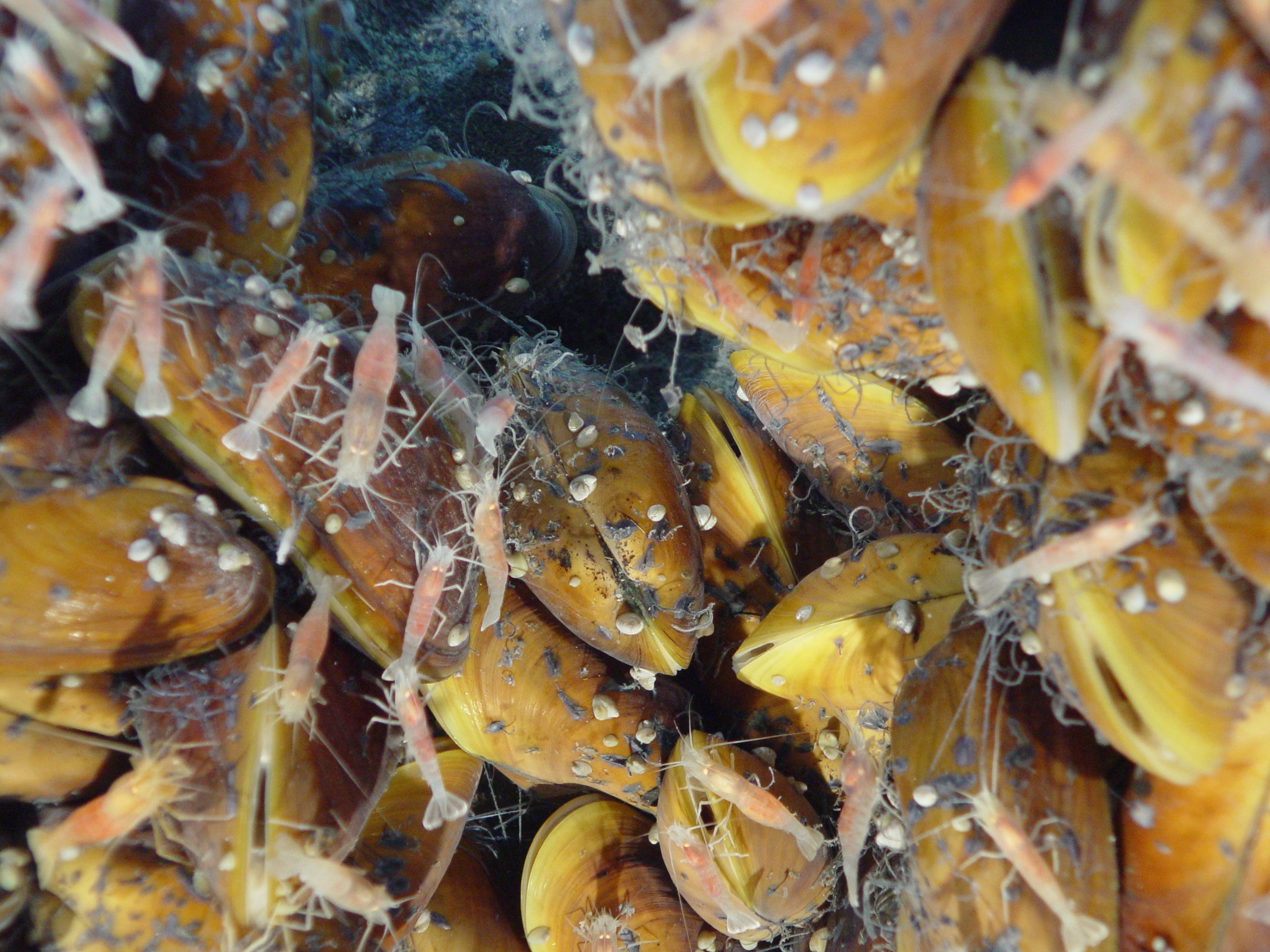
Hydrothermal vent mussels and shrimps

Most animals rely on biomass and bioenergy produced by plants and phytoplanktons (collectively called producers) through photosynthesis. Herbivores, as primary consumers, eat the plant material directly to digest and absorb the nutrients, while carnivores and other animals on higher trophic levels indirectly acquire the nutrients by eating the herbivores or other animals that have eaten the herbivores. Animals oxidise carbohydrates, lipids, proteins and other biomolecules in cellular respiration, which allows the animal to grow and to sustain basal metabolism and fuel other biological processes such as locomotion. Of the 550 gigatons of carbon biomass on Earth, animals account for 2 gigatons. Some benthic animals living close to hydrothermal vents and cold seeps on the dark sea floor consume organic matter produced through chemosynthesis (via oxidising inorganic compounds such as hydrogen sulfide) by archaea and bacteria.

Animals originated in the ocean; all extant animal phyla, except for Micrognathozoa and Onychophora, feature at least some marine species. However, several lineages of arthropods begun to colonise land around the same time as land plants, between 510 and 471 million years ago, during the Late Cambrian or Early Ordovician periods. Vertebrates such as the lobe-finned fish Tiktaalik started to move on to land in the late Devonian, about 375 million years ago.

Animals occupy virtually all of earth's habitats and microhabitats, with faunas adapted to salt water, hydrothermal vents, fresh water, hot springs, swamps, forests, pastures, deserts, air, and the interiors of other organisms. Animals are however not particularly heat tolerant; very few of them can survive at constant temperatures above 50 °C (122 °F) or in the most extreme cold deserts of continental Antarctica.

The collective global geomorphic influence of animals on the processes shaping the Earth's surface remains largely understudied, with most studies limited to individual species and well-known exemplars.

== Diversity ==
=== Size ===
The blue whale (Balaenoptera musculus) is the largest animal that has ever lived, weighing up to 190 tonnes and measuring up to 33.6 metres (110 ft) long. The largest extant terrestrial animal is the African bush elephant (Loxodonta africana), weighing up to 12.25 tonnes and measuring up to 10.67 metres (35.0 ft) long. The largest terrestrial animals that ever lived were titanosaur sauropod dinosaurs such as Argentinosaurus, which may have weighed as much as 73 tonnes, and Supersaurus which may have reached 39 metres. Several animals are microscopic; some Myxozoa (obligate parasites within the Cnidaria) never grow larger than 20 μm, and one of the smallest species (Myxobolus szekeli) is no more than 8.5 μm when fully grown.

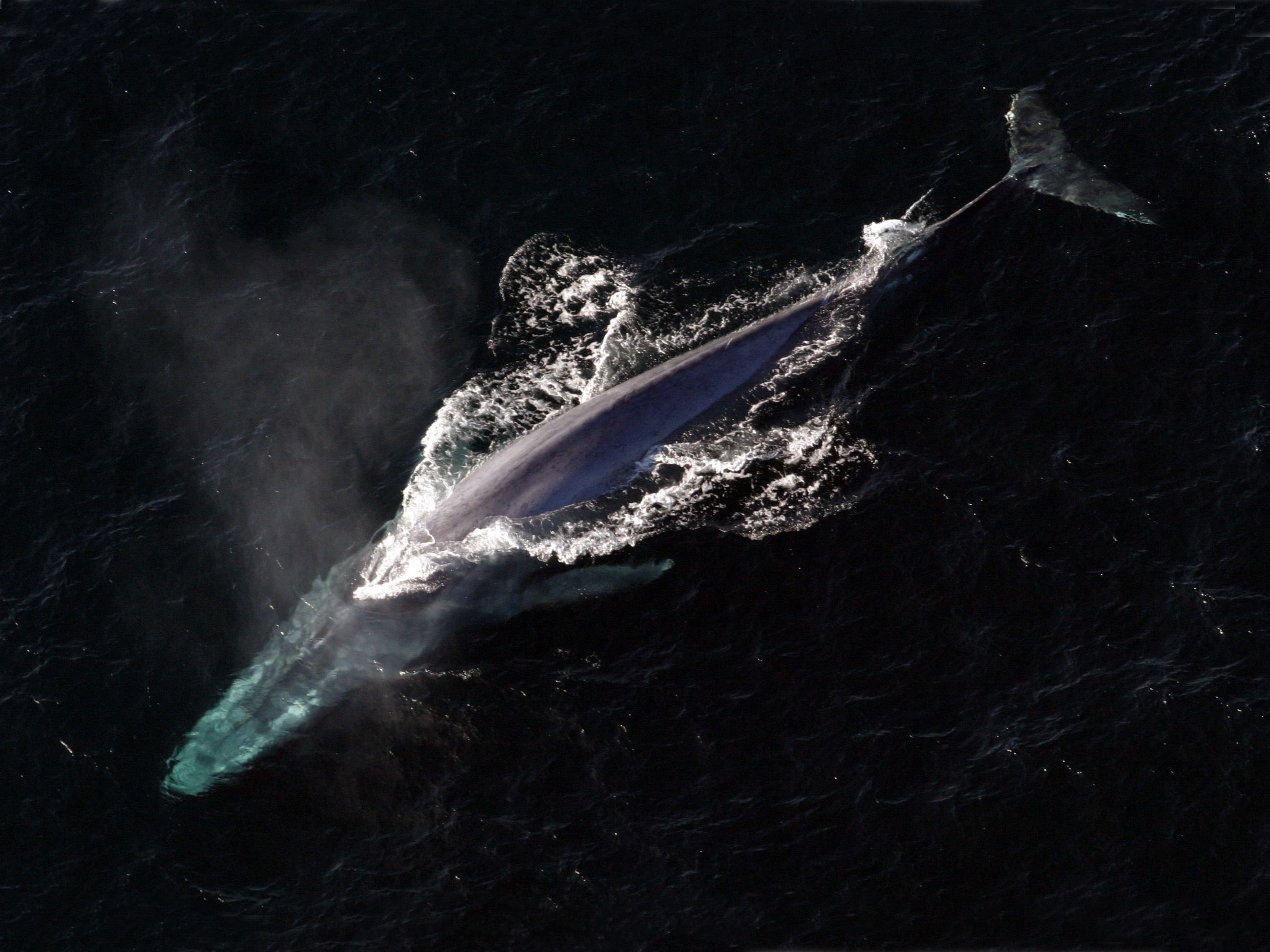
The blue whale is the largest animal that has ever lived; it can be up to 33.6 metres (110 ft) long.

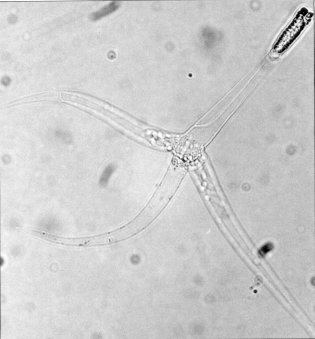
Myxozoans such as Myxobolus cerebralis are single-celled parasites, never more than 20 μm across.

=== Numbers and habitats of major phyla ===
The following table lists estimated numbers of described extant species for the major animal phyla, along with their principal habitats (terrestrial, fresh water, and marine), and free-living or parasitic ways of life. Species estimates shown here are based on numbers described scientifically; much larger estimates have been calculated based on various means of prediction, and these can vary wildly. For instance, around 25,000–27,000 species of nematodes have been described, while published estimates of the total number of nematode species include 10,000–20,000; 500,000; 10 million; and 100 million. Using patterns within the taxonomic hierarchy, the total number of animal species—including those not yet described—was calculated to be about 7.77 million in 2011. (Note: The application of DNA barcoding to taxonomy further complicates this; a 2016 barcoding analysis estimated a total count of nearly 100,000 insect species for Canada alone, and extrapolated that the global insect fauna must be in excess of 10 million species, of which nearly 2 million are in a single fly family known as gall midges (Cecidomyiidae).)

Phylum	Example	Species	Land	Sea	Freshwater	Free-living	Parasitic
Arthropoda	wasp	1,257,000	Yes 1,000,000 (insects)	Yes >40,000 (Malac- ostraca)	Yes 94,000	Yes	Yes >45,000 (Note: Not including parasitoids.)
Mollusca	snail	85,000; 107,000	35,000	60,000	5,000; 12,000	Yes	>5,600
Chordata	green spotted frog facing right	>70,000	23,000	13,000	18,000; 9,000	Yes	40 (catfish)
Platyhelminthes		29,500	Yes	Yes	1,300	Yes 3,000–6,500	>40,000 4,000–25,000
Nematoda		25,000	Yes (soil)	4,000	2,000	11,000	14,000
Annelida		17,000	Yes (soil)	Yes	1,750	Yes	400
Cnidaria	Table coral	16,000		Yes	Few	Yes	>1,350 (Myxozoa)
Porifera		10,800		Yes	200–300	Yes	Yes
Echinodermata		7,500		7,500		Yes	
Bryozoa		6,000		Yes	60–80	Yes	
Rotifera		2,000		>400	2,000	Yes	Yes
Nemertea		1,350		Yes	Yes	Yes	
Tardigrada		1,335	Yes (moist plants)	Yes	Yes	Yes	

== Evolutionary origin ==
The first body fossils of animals appear in the Ediacaran, represented by forms such as Charnia and Spriggina. It had long been doubted whether these fossils truly represented animals, but the discovery of the animal lipid cholesterol in fossils of Dickinsonia suggests that they are. Animals are thought to have originated under low-oxygen conditions, suggesting that they were capable of living entirely by anaerobic respiration, but as they became specialised for aerobic metabolism they became fully dependent on oxygen in their environments.

Many animal phyla first appear in the fossil record during the Cambrian explosion, starting about 539 million years ago, in beds such as the Burgess Shale. Extant phyla in these rocks include molluscs, brachiopods, onychophorans, tardigrades, arthropods, echinoderms and hemichordates, along with numerous now-extinct forms such as the predatory Anomalocaris. The apparent suddenness of the event may however be an artefact of the fossil record, rather than showing that all these animals appeared simultaneously. That view is supported by the discovery of Auroralumina attenboroughii, the earliest known Ediacaran crown-group cnidarian (557–562 mya, some 20 million years before the Cambrian explosion) from Charnwood Forest, England. It is thought to be one of the earliest predators, catching small prey with its nematocysts as modern cnidarians do.

Some palaeontologists have suggested that animals appeared much earlier than the Cambrian explosion, possibly as early as 1 billion years ago. Early fossils that might represent animals appear for example in the 665-million-year-old rocks of the Trezona Formation of South Australia. These fossils are interpreted as most probably being early sponges. Trace fossils such as tracks and burrows found in the Tonian period (from 1 gya) may indicate the presence of triploblastic worm-like animals, roughly as large (about 5 mm wide) and complex as earthworms. However, similar tracks are produced by the giant single-celled protist Gromia sphaerica, so the Tonian trace fossils may not indicate early animal evolution. Around the same time, the layered mats of microorganisms called stromatolites decreased in diversity, perhaps due to grazing by newly evolved animals. Sterane biomarkers, which are usually indicative of demosponges, are found throughout the late Cryogenian and onward, but may also be produced by rhizarians. Objects such as sediment-filled tubes that resemble trace fossils of the burrows of wormlike animals have been found in 1.2 gya rocks in North America, in 1.5 gya rocks in Australia and North America, and in 1.7 gya rocks in Australia. Their interpretation as having an animal origin is disputed, as they might be water-escape or other structures.

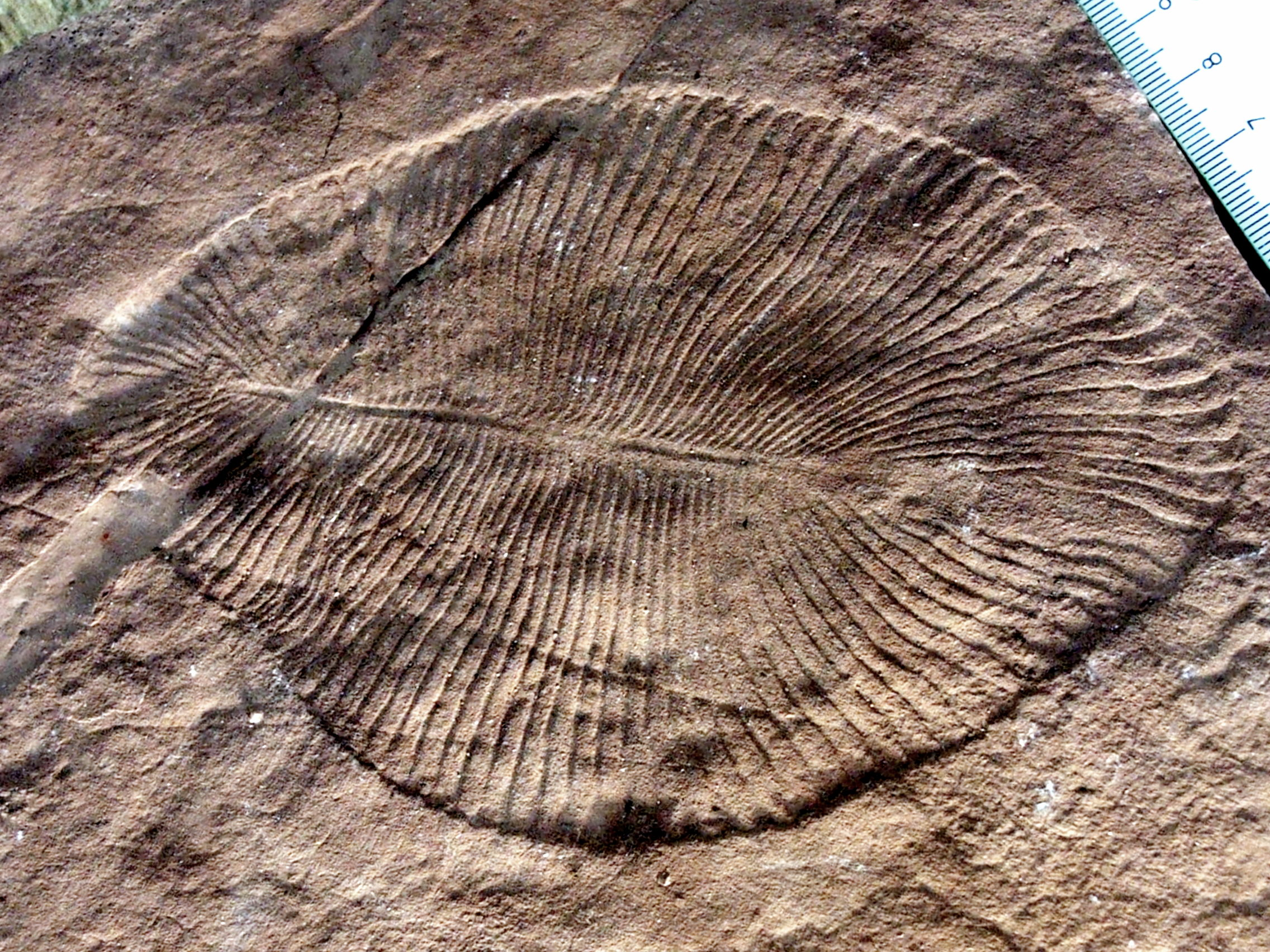
Dickinsonia costata from the Ediacaran biota (c. 635–542 mya) is one of the earliest animal species known.

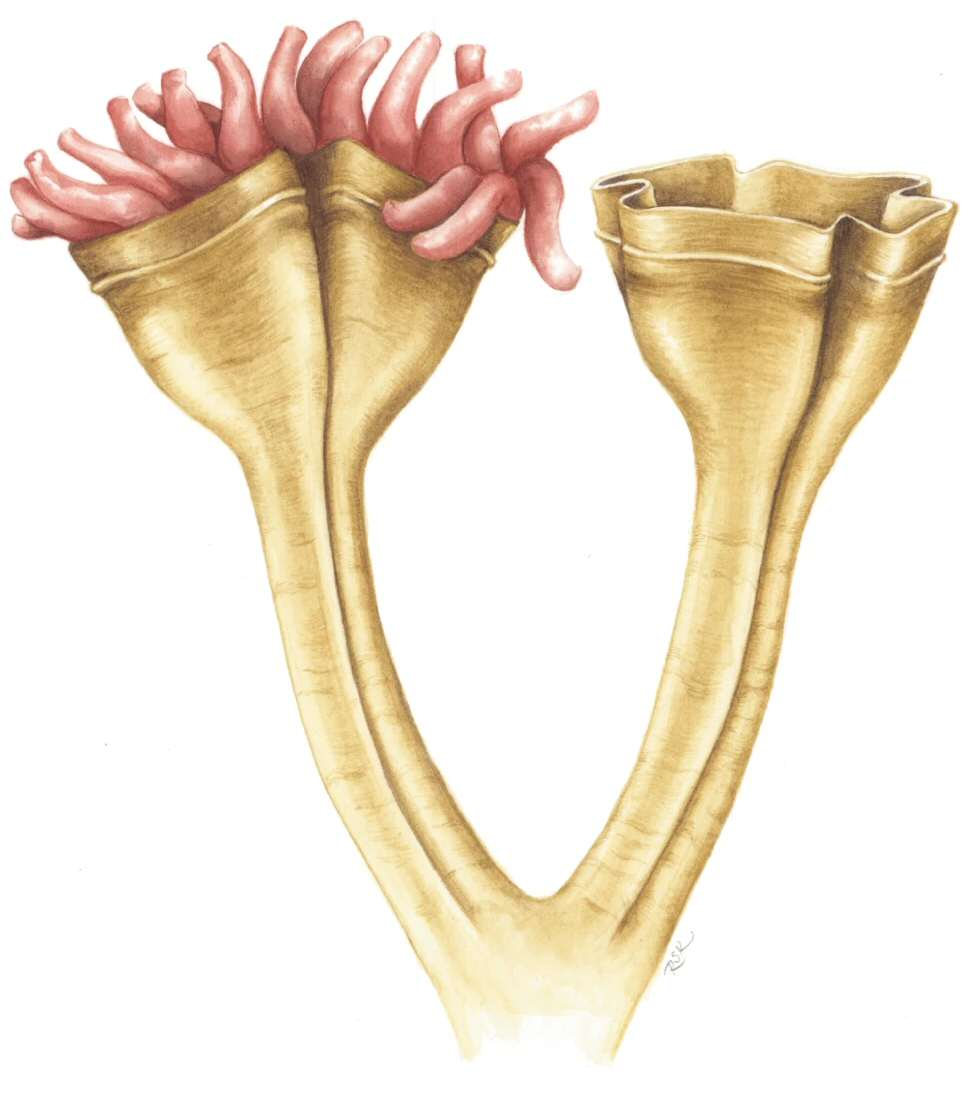
Auroralumina attenboroughii, an Ediacaran predator (c. 560 mya)

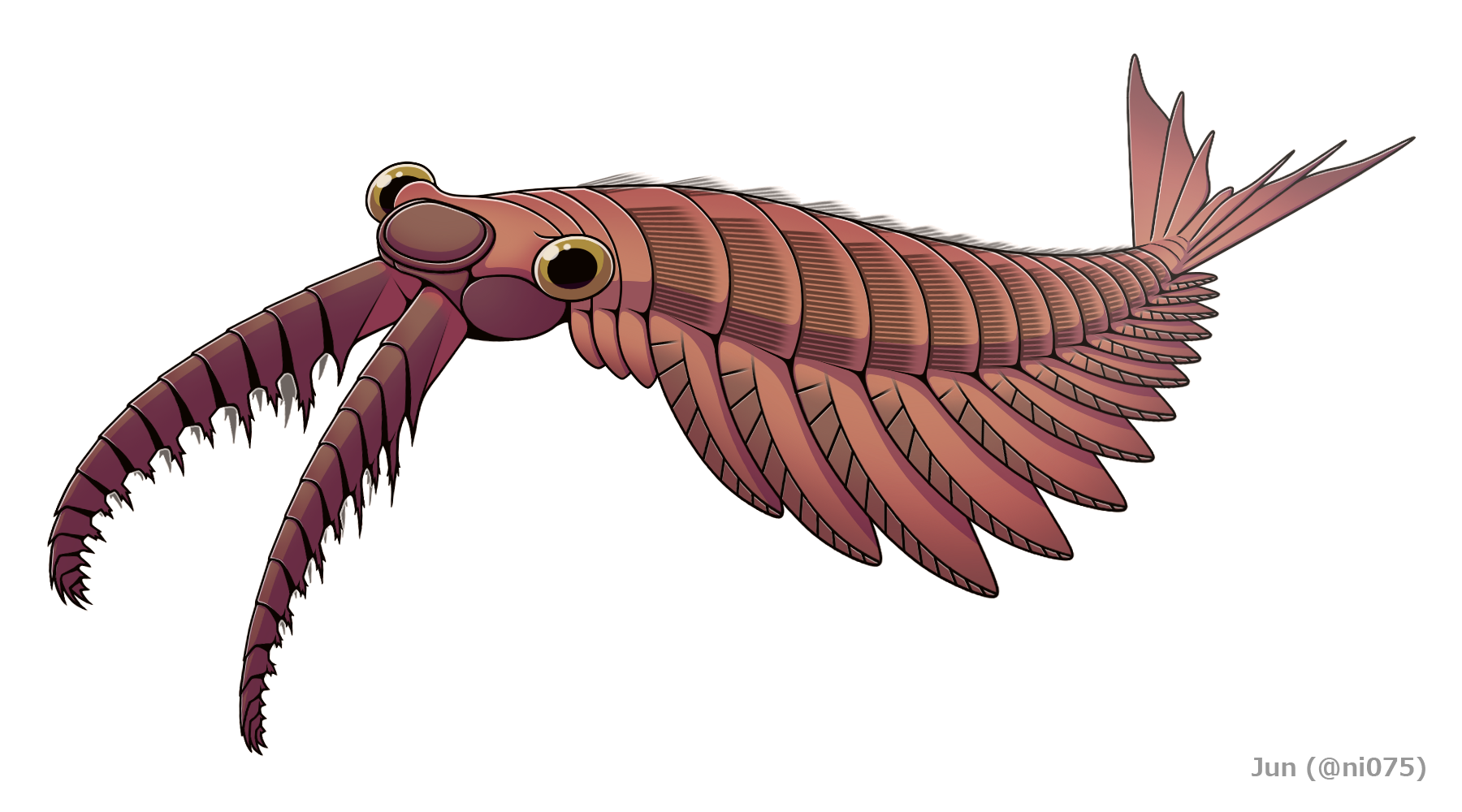
Anomalocaris canadensis is one of the many animal species that emerged in the Cambrian explosion, starting some 539 mya, and found in the fossil beds of the Burgess Shale.

== Phylogeny ==
=== External phylogeny ===
Animals are monophyletic, meaning they are derived from a common ancestor. Animals are the sister group to the choanoflagellates, with which they form the Choanozoa. Ros-Rocher and colleagues (2021) trace the origins of animals to unicellular ancestors, providing the external phylogeny shown in the cladogram. Uncertainty of relationships is indicated with dashed lines. The animal clade had certainly originated by 650 mya, and may have come into being as much as 800 mya, based on molecular clock evidence for different phyla.

- Opisthokonta
  - Holomycota (inc. fungi)
  - Holozoa
    - Ichthyosporea
    - Pluriformea
    - Filozoa
      - Filasterea
      - Choanozoa
        - Choanoflagellatea
        - Animalia over 650 mya

=== Internal phylogeny ===
The relationships at the base of the animal tree have been debated. Other than Ctenophora, the Bilateria and Cnidaria are the only groups with symmetry, and other evidence shows they are closely related. In addition to sponges, Placozoa has no symmetry and was often considered a "missing link" between protists and multicellular animals. The presence of hox genes in Placozoa shows that they were once more complex.

The Porifera (sponges) have long been assumed to be sister to the rest of the animals, but there is evidence that the Ctenophora may be in that position. Molecular phylogenetics has supported both the sponge-sister and ctenophore-sister hypotheses. In 2017, Roberto Feuda and colleagues, using amino acid differences, presented both, with the following cladogram for the sponge-sister view that they supported (their ctenophore-sister tree simply interchanging the places of ctenophores and sponges):

- Animalia multicellular
  - Porifera
  - Eumetazoa
    - Ctenophora
    - ParaHoxozoa hox genes
      - Placozoa
      - symmetry
        - Cnidaria
        - Bilateria

Conversely, a 2023 study by Darrin Schultz and colleagues uses ancient gene linkages to construct the following ctenophore-sister phylogeny:

- Animalia multicellular
  - Ctenophora
  - Myriazoa
    - Porifera
    - ParaHoxozoa hox genes
      - - Placozoa
        - Cnidaria
      - symmetry
        Bilateria

=== Porifera ===
Sponges are physically very distinct from other animals, and were long thought to have diverged first, representing the oldest animal phylum and forming a sister clade to all other animals. Despite their morphological dissimilarity with all other animals, genetic evidence suggests sponges may be more closely related to other animals than the comb jellies are. Sponges lack the complex organisation found in most other animal phyla; their cells are differentiated, but in most cases not organised into distinct tissues, unlike all other animals. Sponges are almost entirely sessile in their adult stage. They lack true nerve cells.

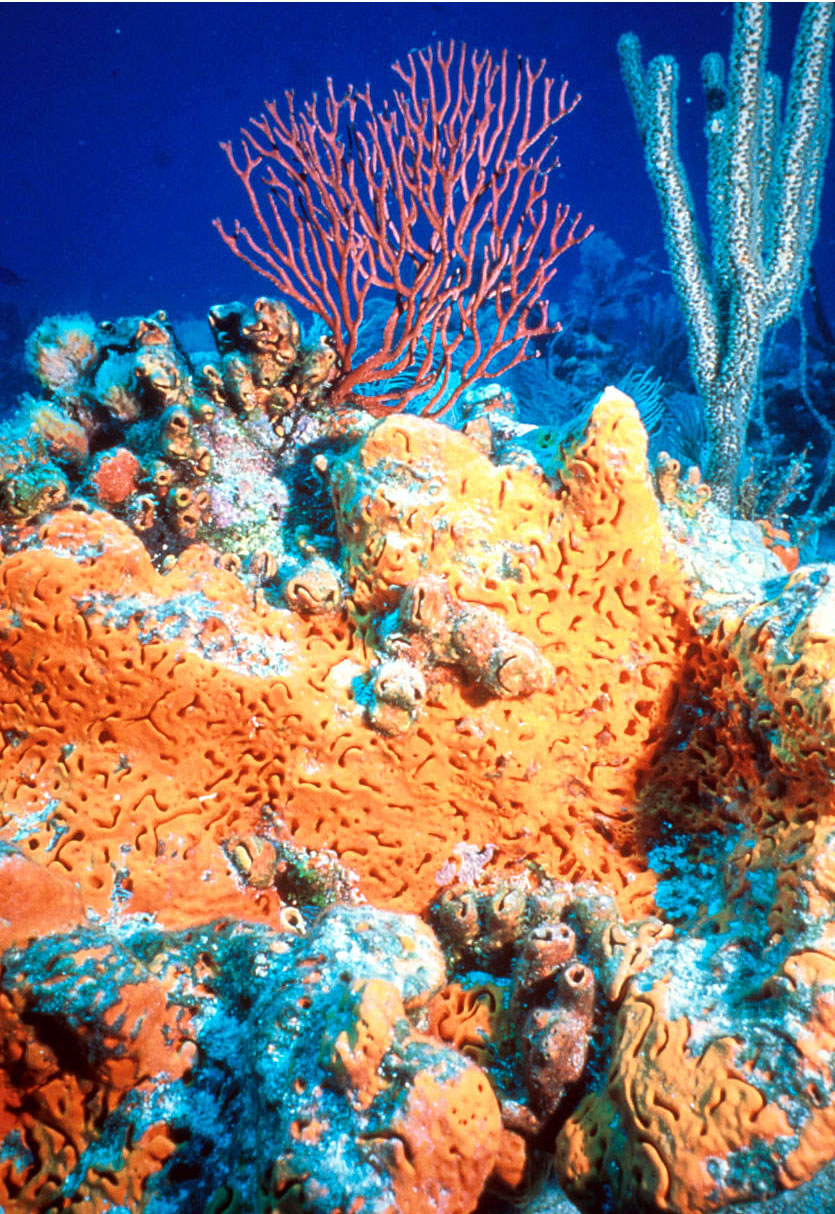
Non-bilaterian animals include sponges (centre) and corals (background).

Sponges lack a digestive, circulatory, respiratory, or excretory system. Instead, they rely on the flow of water through their bodies to perform these functions. Many have adapted a hollow structure to facilitate the flow of water through their bodies. They typically feed by drawing in water through pores, filtering out small particles of food. They absorb oxygen dissolved in water, and they release carbon dioxide and nitrogenous waste into water that flows through them. Sponges can reproduce sexually and asexually. Asexual reproduction happens through a variety of mechanisms including by fragmentation, where a piece of the sponge splits off and reestablishes somewhere else. For sexual reproduction, most sponges are hermaphrodites, they produce both egg and sperm cells.

=== Ctenophora ===
Comb jellies, members of Ctenophora, are radially symmetric and have digestive chambers with a single opening, which serves as both mouth and anus. Ctenophora have distinct tissues, but these are not organised into discrete organs. They move using large arrays of cilia, called swimming plates. Almost all comb jellies are predatory. They are unique in having colloblasts, structures on their tentacles that help them catch prey. They have nerve cells, but lack a brain or central nervous system. Instead their nerves are arranged into a nerve net. Their nerves are very different from those of other animals, and evidence suggests that their nerves developed independently of the nerves of other animals.

=== Cnidaria ===
Like Ctenophora, Cnidaria are radially symmetric and have digestive chambers with a single opening, which serves as both mouth and anus. They also have distinct tissues that are not organised into discrete organs. Members of the group Anthozoa, such as sea anemones, coral, and sea pens only are sessile polyps. Most members of Medusozoa, including jellyfish and most hydrozoans, have a polyp form as well, but also have a motile medusae stage. The medusae stage are commonly known as jellyfish. Cnidaria are diploblastic, having only two main germ layers, ectoderm and endoderm.

=== Placozoa ===
The tiny placozoans have no permanent digestive chamber and no symmetry; they superficially resemble amoebae. Their phylogeny is poorly defined, and under active research.

=== Bilateria ===
The remaining animals, the great majority—comprising some 29 phyla and over a million species—form the Bilateria clade, which have a bilaterally symmetric body plan. The Bilateria are triploblastic, with three well-developed germ layers, and their tissues form distinct organs. The digestive chamber has two openings, a mouth and an anus, and in the Nephrozoa there is an internal body cavity, a coelom or pseudocoelom. These animals have a head end (anterior) and a tail end (posterior), a back (dorsal) surface and a belly (ventral) surface, and a left and a right side. A modern consensus phylogenetic tree for the Bilateria is shown below.

- Bilateria
  - Xenacoelomorpha
  - Nephrozoa 650 Mya
    - Deuterostomia
      - Ambulacraria
      - Chordata
    - Protostomia 610 mya
      - Ecdysozoa
      - Spiralia

Idealised nephrozoan body plan. (Note: Compare File:Annelid redone w white background.svg for a more specific and detailed model of a particular phylum with this general body plan.) With an elongated body and a direction of movement the animal has head and tail ends. Sense organs and mouth form the basis of the head. Opposed circular and longitudinal muscles enable peristaltic motion.

Having a front end means that this part of the body encounters stimuli, such as food, favouring cephalisation, the development of a head with sense organs and a mouth. Many bilaterians have a combination of circular muscles that constrict the body, making it longer, and an opposing set of longitudinal muscles, that shorten the body; these enable soft-bodied animals with a hydrostatic skeleton to move by peristalsis. They also have a gut that extends through the basically cylindrical body from mouth to anus. Many bilaterian phyla have primary larvae which swim with cilia and have an apical organ containing sensory cells. However, over evolutionary time, descendant spaces have evolved which have lost one or more of each of these characteristics. For example, adult echinoderms are radially symmetric (unlike their larvae), while some parasitic worms have extremely simplified body structures.

Genetic studies have considerably changed zoologists' understanding of the relationships within the Bilateria. Most appear to belong to two major lineages, the protostomes and the deuterostomes. It is often suggested that the basalmost bilaterians are the Xenacoelomorpha, with all other bilaterians belonging to the subclade Nephrozoa. However, this suggestion has been contested, with other studies finding that xenacoelomorphs are more closely related to Ambulacraria than to other bilaterians.

==== Protostomes and deuterostomes ====
Protostomes and deuterostomes differ in several ways. Early in development, deuterostome embryos undergo radial cleavage during cell division, while many protostomes (the Spiralia) undergo spiral cleavage. Animals from both groups possess a complete digestive tract, but in protostomes the first opening of the embryonic gut develops into the mouth, and the anus forms secondarily. In deuterostomes, the anus forms first while the mouth develops secondarily. Most protostomes have schizocoelous development, where cells simply fill in the interior of the gastrula to form the mesoderm. In deuterostomes, the mesoderm forms by enterocoelic pouching, through invagination of the endoderm.

The main deuterostome taxa are the Ambulacraria and the Chordata. Ambulacraria are exclusively marine and include acorn worms, starfish, sea urchins, and sea cucumbers. The chordates are dominated by the vertebrates (animals with backbones), which consist of fishes, amphibians, reptiles, birds, and mammals.

The protostomes include the Ecdysozoa, named after their shared trait of ecdysis, growth by moulting, Among the largest ecdysozoan phyla are the arthropods and the nematodes. The rest of the protostomes are in the Spiralia, named for their pattern of developing by spiral cleavage in the early embryo. Major spiralian phyla include the annelids and molluscs.

The bilaterian gut develops in two ways. In many protostomes, the blastopore develops into the mouth, while in deuterostomes it becomes the anus.

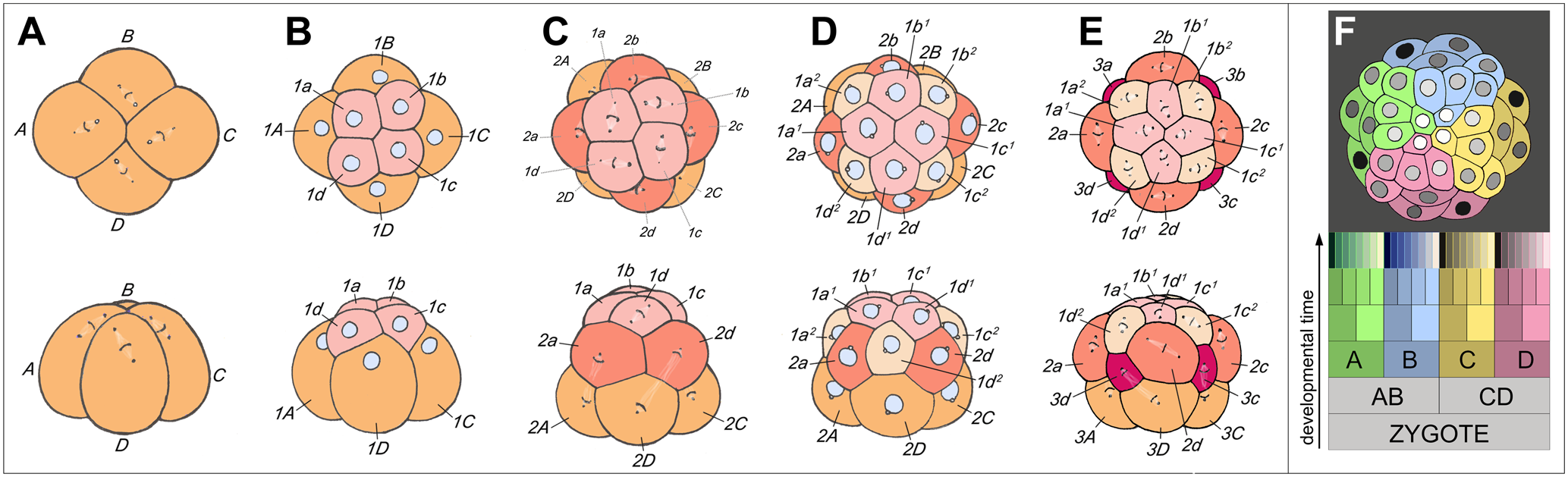
The Spiralia develop with spiral cleavage in the embryo, as here in a sea snail.

== History of classification ==
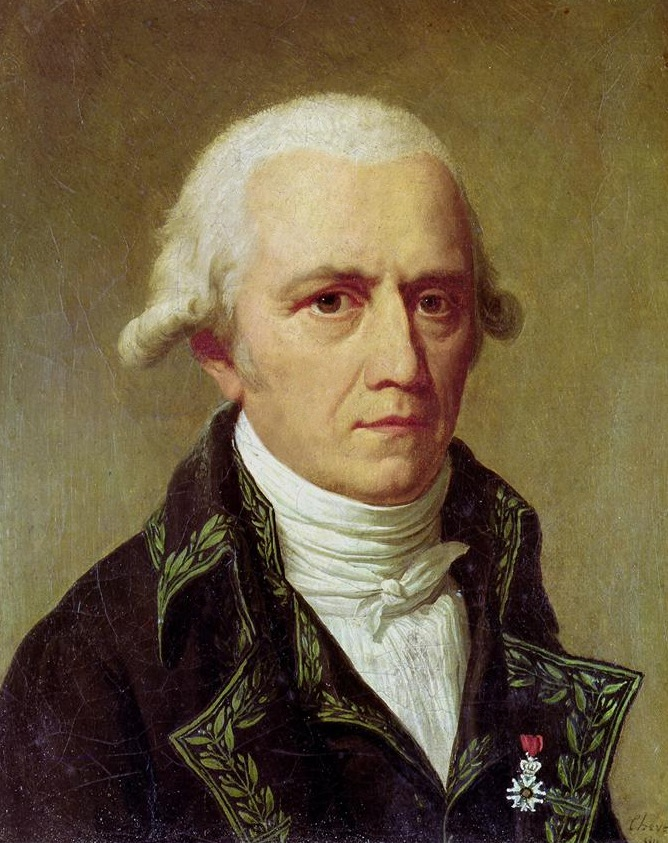
Jean-Baptiste de Lamarck led the creation of a modern classification of invertebrates, breaking up Linnaeus's "Vermes" into nine phyla by 1809.

In the classical era, Aristotle divided animals, (Note: In his History of Animals and Parts of Animals.) based on his own observations, into those with blood (roughly, the vertebrates) and those without. The animals were then arranged on a scale from man (with blood, two legs, rational soul) down through the live-bearing tetrapods (with blood, four legs, sensitive soul) and other groups such as crustaceans (no blood, many legs, sensitive soul) down to spontaneously generating creatures like sponges (no blood, no legs, vegetable soul). Aristotle was uncertain whether sponges were animals, which in his system ought to have sensation, appetite, and locomotion, or plants, which did not: he knew that sponges could sense touch and would contract if about to be pulled off their rocks, but that they were rooted like plants and never moved about.

In 1758, Carl Linnaeus created the first hierarchical classification in his Systema Naturae. In his original scheme, the animals were one of three kingdoms, divided into the classes of Vermes, Insecta, Pisces, Amphibia, Aves, and Mammalia. Since then, the last four have all been subsumed into a single phylum, the Chordata, while his Insecta (which included the crustaceans and arachnids) and Vermes have been renamed or broken up. The process was begun in 1793 by Jean-Baptiste de Lamarck, who called the Vermes une espèce de chaos ('a chaotic mess') (Note: The French prefix une espèce de is pejorative.) and split the group into three new phyla: worms, echinoderms, and polyps (which contained corals and jellyfish). By 1809, in his Philosophie Zoologique, Lamarck had created nine phyla apart from vertebrates (where he still had four phyla: mammals, birds, reptiles, and fish) and molluscs, namely cirripedes, annelids, crustaceans, arachnids, insects, worms, radiates, polyps, and infusorians.

In his 1817 Le Règne Animal, Georges Cuvier used comparative anatomy to group the animals into four embranchements ('branches' with different body plans, roughly corresponding to phyla), namely vertebrates, molluscs, articulated animals (arthropods and annelids), and zoophytes (radiata) (echinoderms, cnidaria and other forms). This division into four was followed by the embryologist Karl Ernst von Baer in 1828, the zoologist Louis Agassiz in 1857, and the comparative anatomist Richard Owen in 1860.

In 1874, Ernst Haeckel divided the animal kingdom into two subkingdoms: Metazoa (multicellular animals, with five phyla: coelenterates, echinoderms, articulates, molluscs, and vertebrates) and Protozoa (single-celled animals), including a sixth animal phylum, sponges. The protozoa were later moved to the former kingdom Protista, leaving only the Metazoa as a synonym of Animalia.

== In human culture ==
=== Practical uses ===
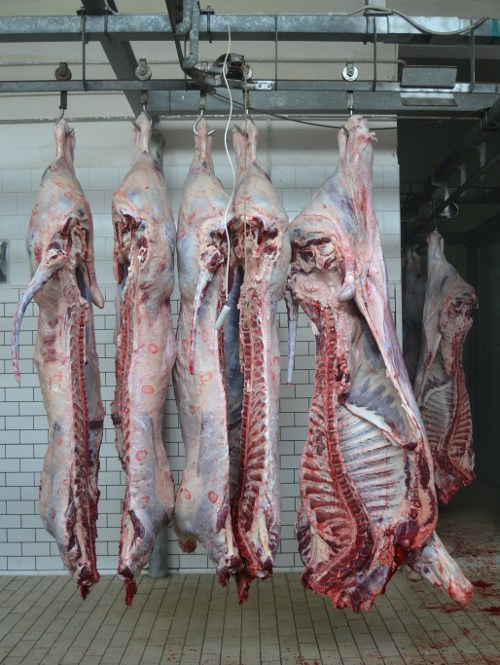
Sides of beef in a slaughterhouse

The human population exploits a large number of other animal species for food, both of domesticated livestock species in animal husbandry and, mainly at sea, by hunting wild species. Marine fish of many species are caught commercially for food. A smaller number of species are farmed commercially. Humans and their livestock make up more than 90% of the biomass of all terrestrial vertebrates, and almost as much as all insects combined.

Invertebrates including cephalopods, crustaceans, insects—principally bees and silkworms—and bivalve or gastropod molluscs are hunted or farmed for food, fibres. Chickens, cattle, sheep, pigs, and other animals are raised as livestock for meat across the world. Animal fibres such as wool and silk are used to make textiles, while animal sinews have been used as lashings and bindings, and leather is widely used to make shoes and other items. Animals have been hunted and farmed for their fur to make items such as coats and hats. Dyestuffs including carmine (cochineal), shellac, and kermes have been made from the bodies of insects. Working animals including cattle and horses have been used for work and transport from the first days of agriculture.

Animals such as the fruit fly Drosophila melanogaster serve a major role in science as experimental models. Animals have been used to create vaccines since their discovery in the 18th century. Some medicines such as the cancer drug trabectedin are based on toxins or other molecules of animal origin.

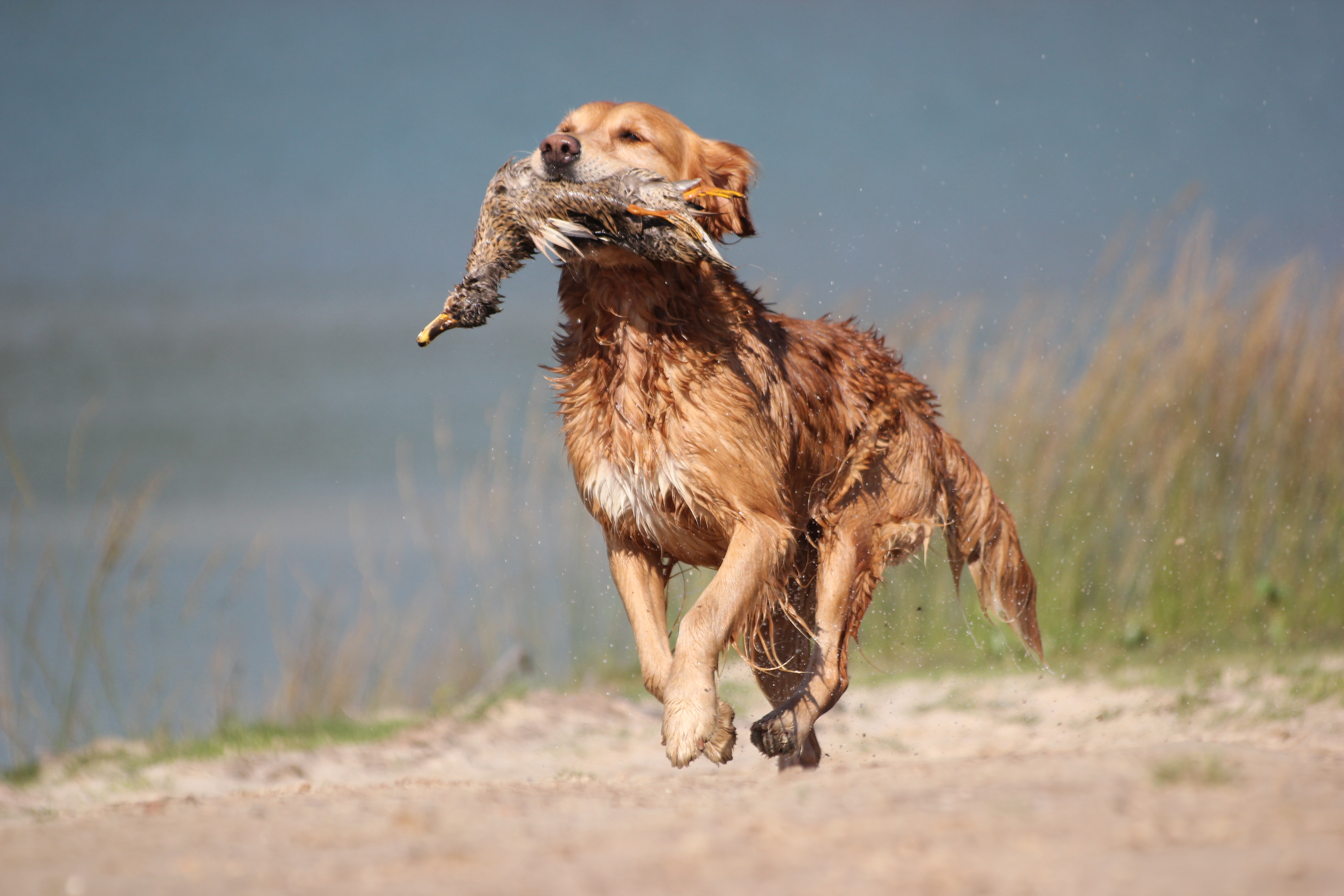
A gun dog retrieving a duck during a hunt

People have used hunting dogs to help chase down and retrieve animals, and birds of prey to catch birds and mammals, while tethered cormorants have been used to catch fish. Poison dart frogs have been used to poison the tips of blowpipe darts. A wide variety of animals are kept as pets, from invertebrates such as tarantulas, octopuses, and praying mantises, reptiles such as snakes and chameleons, and birds including canaries, parakeets, and parrots all finding a place. However, the most kept pet species are mammals, namely dogs, cats, and rabbits. There is a tension between the role of animals as companions to humans, and their existence as individuals with rights of their own.

A wide variety of terrestrial and aquatic animals are hunted for sport.

=== Symbolic uses ===
The signs of the Western and Chinese zodiacs are based on animals. In China and Japan, the butterfly has been seen as the personification of a person's soul, and in classical representation the butterfly is also the symbol of the soul.

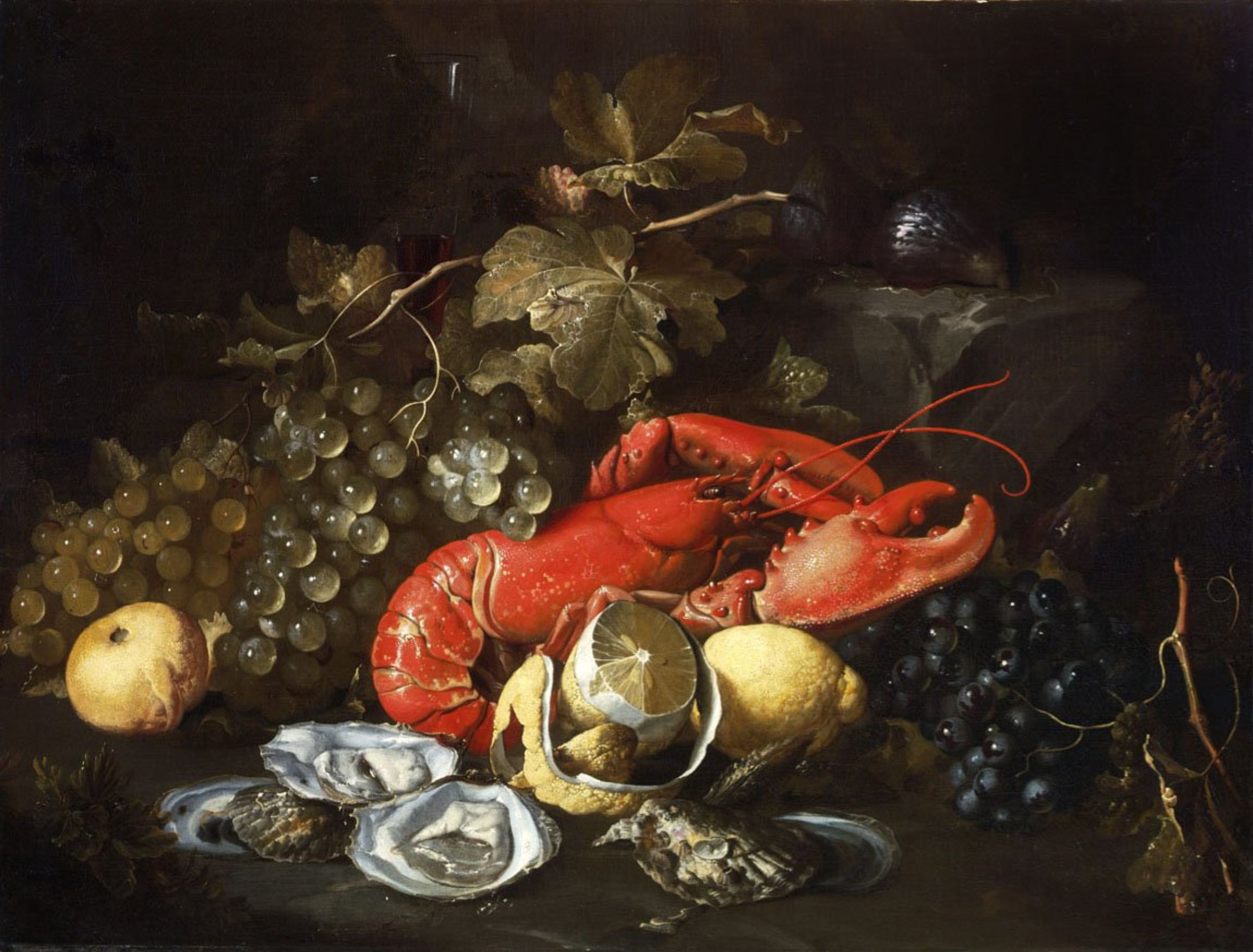
Artistic vision: Still Life with Lobster and Oysters by Alexander Coosemans, c. 1660

Animals have been the subjects of art from the earliest times, both historical, as in ancient Egypt, and prehistoric, as in the cave paintings at Lascaux. Major animal paintings include Albrecht Dürer's 1515 The Rhinoceros, and George Stubbs's c. 1762 horse portrait Whistlejacket. Insects, birds and mammals play roles in literature and film, such as in giant bug movies.

Animals including insects and mammals feature in mythology and religion. The scarab beetle was sacred in ancient Egypt, and the cow is sacred in Hinduism. Among other mammals, deer, horses, lions, bats, bears, and wolves are the subjects of myths and worship.

== See also ==
- Animal coloration – General appearance of an animal
- Ethology – Study of animal behaviour
- Lists of organisms by population
- World Animal Day – Observed on 4 October
