= Histogenesis =

Histogenesis is the formation of different tissues from undifferentiated cells. These cells are constituents of three primary germ layers, the endoderm, mesoderm, and ectoderm. The science of the microscopic structures of the tissues formed within histogenesis is termed histology.

== Germ layers ==
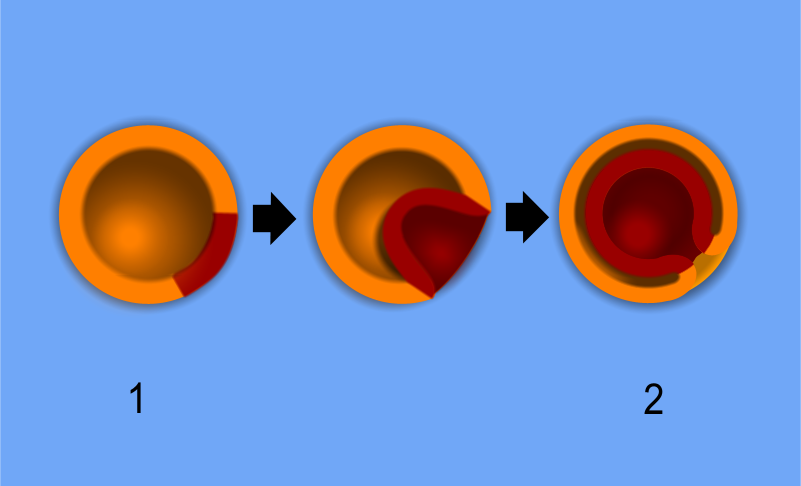
Gastrulation of a diploblast: The formation of germ layers from a (1) blastula to a (2) gastrula. Some of the ectoderm cells (orange) move inward forming the endoderm (red).

A germ layer is a collection of cells formed during animal embryogenesis. Germ layers are typically pronounced within vertebrate organisms; however, animals more complex than sponges (eumetazoans and agnotozoans) produce two or three primary tissue layers. Animals with radial symmetry, such as cnidarians, produce two layers, called the ectoderm and endoderm. They are diploblastic. Animals with bilateral symmetry produce a third layer in-between called mesoderm, making them triploblastic. Germ layers will eventually give rise to all of an animal's or mammal's tissues and organs through a process called organogenesis.

=== Endoderm ===
The endoderm is one of the germ layers formed during animal embryogenesis. Cells migrating inward along the archenteron form the inner layer of the gastrula, which develops into the endoderm. Initially, the endoderm consists of flattened cells, which subsequently become columnar...

=== Mesoderm ===
The mesoderm germ layer forms in the embryos of animals and mammals more complex than cnidarians, making them triploblastic. During gastrulation, some of the cells migrating inward to form the endoderm form an additional layer between the endoderm and the ectoderm. A theory suggests that this key innovation evolved hundreds of millions of years ago and led to the evolution of nearly all large, complex animals. The formation of a mesoderm led to the formation of a coelom. Organs formed inside a coelom can freely move, grow, and develop independently of the body wall while fluid cushions and protects them from shocks.

=== Ectoderm ===
The ectoderm is the start of a tissue that covers the body surfaces. It emerges first and forms from the outermost of the germ layers.

== Production ==
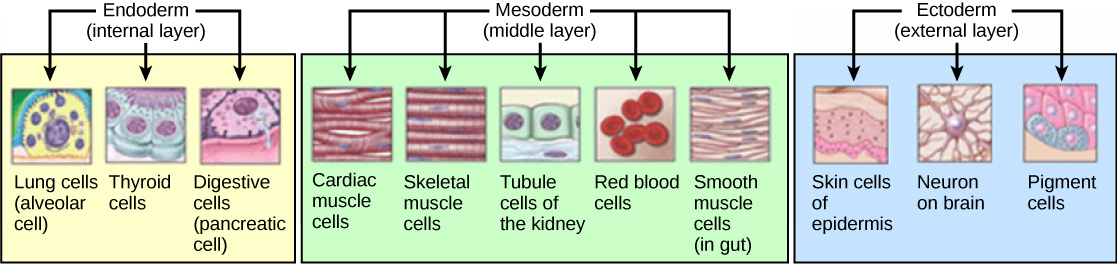
The endoderm produces tissue within the lungs, thyroid, and pancreas. The mesoderm aids in the production of cardiac muscle, skeletal muscle, smooth muscle, tissues within the kidneys, and red blood cells. The ectoderm produces tissues within the epidermis and aids in the formation of neurons within the brain, and melanocytes.

The proceeding graph represents the products produced by the three germ layers.

| Germ Layer | Category | Product |
|---|---|---|
| Endoderm | General | Gastrointestinal tract |
| Endodern | General | Respiratory tract |
| Endoderm | General | Endocrine glands and organs (liver and pancreas) |
| Mesoderm | Vertebrate | Bones and most cartilage |
| Mesoderm | General | Most of the Circulatory system |
| Mesoderm | General | Connective tissues of the gut and integuments |
| Mesoderm | General | Excretory Tract |
| Mesoderm | General | Mesenchyme |
| Mesoderm | General | Mesothelium |
| Mesoderm | General | Muscles |
| Mesoderm | General | Peritoneum |
| Mesoderm | General | Reproductive System |
| Mesoderm | General | Urinary System |
| Mesoderm | Vertebrate | Lateral plate mesoderm |
| Ectoderm | General | Nervous system |
| Ectoderm | General | Outer part of integument |
| Ectoderm | Vertebrate | Skin (along with glands, hair, nails) |
| Ectoderm | Vertebrate | Epithelium of the mouth and nasal cavity |
| Ectoderm | Vertebrate | Lens and cornea of the eye |
| Ectoderm | Vertebrate | Melanocytes |
| Ectoderm | Vertebrate | Peripheral nervous system |
| Ectoderm | Vertebrate | Facial cartilage |
| Ectoderm | Vertebrate | Dentin (in teeth) |
| Ectoderm | Vertebrate | Brain (rhombencephalon, mesencephalon & prosencephalon) |
| Ectoderm | Vertebrate | Spinal cord and motor neurons |
| Ectoderm | Vertebrate | Retina |
| Ectoderm | Vertebrate | Posterior pituitary |

== See also ==
- Histology
- List of human cell types derived from the germ layers
