= Schizocoely =

Development process of some animals

Schizocoely (adjective forms: schizocoelous or schizocoelic) is a process by which some animal embryos develop. The schizocoely mechanism occurs when secondary body cavities (coeloms) are formed by splitting a solid mass of mesodermal embryonic tissue. All schizocoelomates are protostomians and they show holoblastic, spiral, determinate cleavage.

== Etymology ==
The term schizocoely derives from the Ancient Greek words σχίζω (skhízō), meaning 'to split', and κοιλία (koilía), meaning 'cavity'. This refers to the fact that fluid-filled body cavities are formed by splitting of mesodermal cells.

== Taxonomic distribution ==
Animals called protostomes develop through schizocoely for which they are also known as schizocoelomates.

Schizocoelous development often occurs in protostomes, as in phyla Mollusca, Annelida, and Arthropoda. Deuterostomes usually exhibit enterocoely; however, some deuterostomes like enteropneusts can exhibit schizocoely as well.

== Embryonic development ==
The term refers to the order of organization of cells in the gastrula leading to development of the coelom. In mollusks, annelids, and arthropods, the mesoderm (the middle germ layer) forms as a solid mass of migrated cells from the single layer of the gastrula. The new mesoderm then splits, creating the pocket-like cavity of the coelom.

== See also ==
- Deuterostome
- Development of the digestive system
- Developmental biology
- Embryology
- Embryonic development
- Ontogeny
- Protostome
