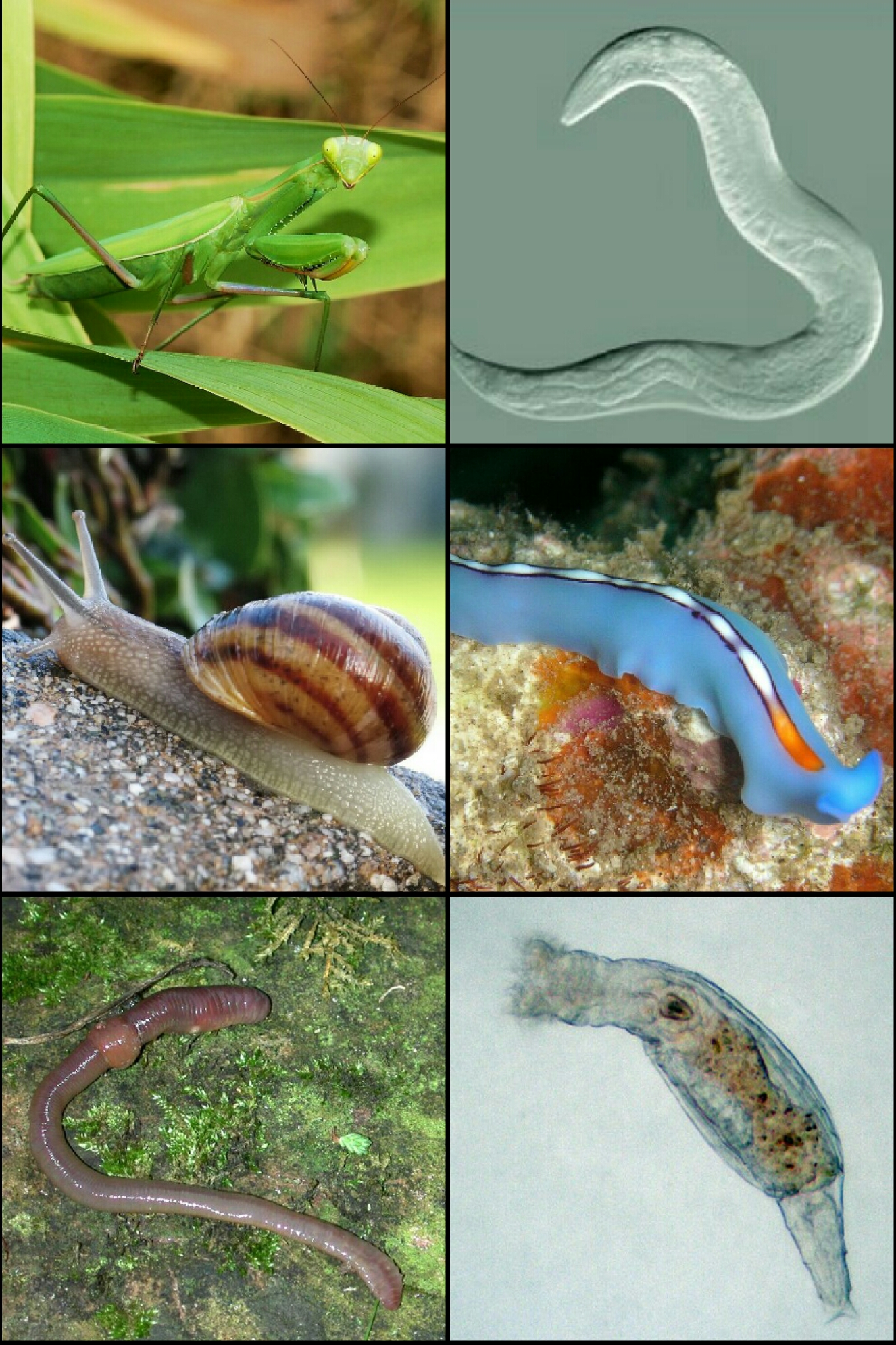

Scientific classification
- Kingdom: Animalia
- Subkingdom: Eumetazoa
- Clade: ParaHoxozoa
- Clade: Bilateria
- Clade: Nephrozoa
- Clade: Protostomia; Grobben, 1908

Subgroups
- Ecdysozoa; Spiralia

= Protostome =

Protostomes Temporal range: Ediacaran - Present

Clade of animals whose mouth develops before the anus

Protostomia (/ˌproʊtəˈstoʊmi.ə/) is the clade of animals once thought to be characterized by the creature's blastopore becoming its mouth during embryonic development. This nature has since been discovered to be extremely variable among Protostomia's members, although the reverse is typically true of its sister clade, Deuterostomia. Well-known examples of protostomes are arthropods, molluscs, annelids, flatworms and nematodes. They are also called schizocoelomates since schizocoely typically occurs in them.

Together with the Deuterostomia and Xenacoelomorpha, these form the clade Bilateria, animals with bilateral symmetry, anteroposterior axis and three germ layers.

== Protostomy ==
In animals at least as complex as earthworms, the first phase in gut development involves the embryo forming a dent on one side (the blastopore) which deepens to become its digestive tube (the archenteron). In the sister-clade, the deuterostomes (lit. 'second-mouth'), the original dent becomes the anus while the gut eventually tunnels through to make another opening, which forms the mouth. The protostomes (from Greek πρωτο- prōto- 'first' + στόμα stóma 'mouth') were so named because it was once believed that in all cases the embryological dent formed the mouth while the anus was formed later, at the opening made by the other end of the gut. It is now known that the fate of the blastopore among protostomes is extremely variable; while the evolutionary distinction between deuterostomes and protostomes remains valid, the descriptive accuracy of the name protostome is disputable.

Protostome and deuterostome embryos differ in several other ways. Secondary body cavities (coeloms) generally form by schizocoely, where the coelom forms out of a solid mass of embryonic tissue splitting away from the rest, instead of by enterocoelic pouching, where the coelom would otherwise form out of in-folded gut walls.

== Evolution ==
Protostomes comprise around 95% of extant animal diversity and over 20 extant phyla, including the two most speciose living animal phyla: Arthropoda, with around 1.165 million described living species (87% of all living protostome species), and Mollusca, with over 117,000.

Protostomes are divided into the Ecdysozoa (e.g. arthropods, nematodes) and the Spiralia (e.g. molluscs, annelids, platyhelminths, and rotifers). A modern consensus phylogenetic tree for the protostomes is shown below:

- Nephrozoa
  - Deuterostomia
  - Protostomia
    - Ecdysozoa
    - Spiralia

== See also ==
- Embryological origins of the mouth and anus
- Urbilaterian, a hypothethical common ancestor to Protostomes and Deuterostomes
