= Human consumption =

Human consumption may refer to:

- Anthropophagy (disambiguation), the consumption of humans
- Consumption (economics), consumption of goods by humans
- Consumer (food chain), consumption of other organisms by humans
- Consumption (sociology)
- Tuberculosis, historically called consumption
