= Lewis' law =

Observed property of epithelial cells

Lewis' law gives a relationship between the size and the shape of epithelial cells. It states that the average apical area $\bar{A}_n$of an epithelial cell is linearly related to its neighbor number $n$. It is a phenomenological law that was first described in the cucumber epidermis by the morphologist Frederic Thomas Lewis in 1928. The simplest version of Lewis' law can be expressed as $\frac{\overline{A_n}}{\overline{A}}=\frac{n-2}{4}$, which reads: The average apical area of a cell with $n$ neighbors (divided by the average apical area of all cells) is proportional to its shape. While neighbor number distributions change throughout organogenesis, the average neighbor number of epithelial cells is $\bar{n}\approx 6$, which can be traced back to Euler's formula for polygons.

== Discovery ==
Frederic Thomas Lewis noticed that epidermal cells display a patterning similar to froths, which led him to quantify and analyze the sizes and shapes of epidermal cells.

== Confirmation and mechanism ==
A variety of empirical studies in different epithelial tissues have confirmed Lewis' law.

It has been suggested that the emergence of Lewis' law on the apical surface of epithelia is a result of the concurrence of

- the tendency of cells to minimize intercellular contact surface energy, and
- the distribution of apical cell areas (as a result of cellular processes such as cell division).

According to this theory, the observed tissue-specific polygon distributions and Lewis' law arise as a compromise in order to maintain tissue integrity.

== Importance ==
In order to understand morphogenetic events, i.e. the growth and shaping of tissues and organs, it is necessary to analyze the packing of cells into tissues. In that context, an analysis of patterning processes can help to identify the underlying mechanisms that drive morphogenesis.
