= Diploblasty =

State of having two germ layers in embryonic development

Diploblasty is a condition of the early embryo in which there are two primary germ layers: the ectoderm and endoderm.

Diploblasts are the organisms which develop with two germ layers, and include Cnidaria and Ctenophora, formerly grouped together in the phylum Coelenterata, but later understanding of their differences resulted in their being placed in separate phyla.

The endoderm allows them to develop true tissue. This includes tissue associated with the gut and associated glands. The ectoderm, on the other hand, gives rise to the epidermis, the nervous tissue, and if present, nephridia.

Simpler animals, such as sea sponges, have one germ layer and lack true tissue organization.

All the more complex animals (from flat worms to humans) are triploblastic with three germ layers (a mesoderm as well as ectoderm and endoderm). The mesoderm allows them to develop true organs.

Groups of diploblastic animals alive today include jellyfish, corals, sea anemones and comb jellies.

== See also ==
- Triploblasty
