= Karl Grobben =

Austrian zoologist

- Born: Karl Grobben; 27 August 1854
- Died: 13 April 1945 (aged 90)

Karl Grobben (27 August 1854, in Brno – 13 April 1945, in Salzburg) was an Austrian zoologist. He graduated from, and later worked at, the University of Vienna, chiefly on molluscs and crustaceans. He was also the editor of a new edition of Carl Friedrich Wilhelm Claus' Lehrbuch der Zoologie, and the coiner of the terms protostome and deuterostome.

== Taxonomy ==
Taxa named by Grobben include:

- Eumalacostraca Grobben, 1892
- Sagittidae Claus & Grobben, 1905
- Sagittoidea Claus & Grobben, 1905
- Protostomia Grobben, 1908
- Deuterostomia Grobben, 1908

Taxa named in Grobben's honour include:

- Gerbillus grobbeni Klaptocz, 1909
- Sphaerophthalmus grobbeni Spandl, 1923
- Limnadia grobbeni Daday, 1925
- Actinia grobbeni Watzl, 1922
- Paladilhiopsis grobbeni Kuscer, 1928
- Raillietina grobbeni Böhm, 1925
- Trypanophis grobbeni (Poche, 1904)
