= Enterocoely =

Development process of some animals

Enterocoelom (adjective forms: enterocoelic and enterocoelous) describes both the process by which some animal embryos develop and the origin of the cells involved. In enterocoely, a mesoderm (middle layer) is formed in a developing embryo, in which the coelom appears from pouches growing and separating from the digestive tract (also known as the embryonic gut, or archenteron). As the incipient coelomic epithelium originates from archenteral diverticula, the endoderm therefore gives rise to the mesodermal cells.

Diagram depicting a cross section of a deuterostome (vertebrate) embryo in the neurula stage. The location of the coelom is indicated.

== Etymology ==
The term enterocoely derives from the Ancient Greek words ἔντερον (énteron), meaning 'intestine', and κοιλία (koilía), meaning 'cavity'. This refers to the fact that fluid-filled body cavities are formed from pockets related to the embryonic gut.

== Taxonomic distribution ==
Enterocoely is the stage of embryological development of deuterostomes in which the coelom forms. This type of coelom formation occurs in deuterostome animals, which for this reason are also known as enterocoelomates.

By contrast, in protostomes, the body cavity is often formed by schizocoely.

== Embryonic development ==
Enterocoelous development begins once the embryo reaches the gastrula phase of development. At this point, there are two layers of cells: the ectoderm (outermost) and the endoderm (innermost) layers. The mesoderm begins to form as two "pockets" of tissue (one above the endoderm, and one below) are formed via folding of the endoderm. These "pockets" begin to grow larger, and as they do so, they extend towards each other. When the two "pockets" of cells meet, the mesoderm is formed – a complete layer of tissue right in between the endoderm and ectoderm layers. This then leads to the formation of a coelom.

The stage of coelom formation starts with the gastrula; as the archenteron forms, pockets of migrating cells also form, creating another layer between the endoderm and ectoderm, the mesoderm. These pockets gradually expand to form the coelom.

== See also ==
- Development of the digestive system
- Developmental biology
- Embryology
- Embryonic development
- Ontogeny
