= Deuterostome =

Deuterostomes Temporal range: Cambrian–Present538.8–0 Ma
- Diversity of deuterostomes

Scientific classification
- Kingdom: Animalia
- Subkingdom: Eumetazoa
- Clade: ParaHoxozoa
- Clade: Bilateria
- Clade: Nephrozoa
- Superphylum: Deuterostomia; Grobben, 1908

Clades
- Chordata sensu lato; †Vetulicolia?; Vertebrata; Cephalochordata; Tunicata; Ambulacraria; Hemichordata; Echinodermata; †Cambroernida; †Vetulocystida?

Superphylum of bilateral animals

Deuterostomes (from Ancient Greek δεύτερος (deúteros) 'second' and στόμα (stóma) 'mouth') are bilaterian animals of the superphylum Deuterostomia (/ˌdjuːtərəˈstoʊmi.ə/), which are typically characterized by their blastopore becoming their anus during embryonic development. Deuterostomia comprises three phyla: Chordata, Echinodermata, Hemichordata, and the extinct clade Cambroernida.

In deuterostomes, the developing embryo's first opening (the blastopore) becomes the anus and cloaca, while the mouth is formed at a different site later. This was initially the group's distinguishing characteristic, but deuterostomy has since been discovered among protostomes as well. The deuterostomes are also known as enterocoelomates, because their coelom develops through pouching of the gut, enterocoely.

Deuterostomia's sister clade is Protostomia, animals that develop a mouth first and whose digestive tract development is more varied. Protostomia includes the ecdysozoans and spiralians. Together with the Xenacoelomorpha, these constitute the large clade Bilateria, i.e., animals with bilateral symmetry and three germ layers.

== Systematics ==
=== History of classification ===
Initially, Deuterostomia included the phyla Brachiopoda, Bryozoa, Chaetognatha, and Phoronida based on morphological and embryological characteristics. However, Deuterostomia was redefined in 1995 based on DNA molecular sequence analyses, leading to the removal of the lophophorates, which were later combined with other protostome animals to form the superphylum Lophotrochozoa. The arrow worms were also considered possible deuterostomes, but molecular studies have placed them in the protostomes. Genetic studies have also revealed that deuterostomes have more than 30 genes not found in any other animal groups, but which are present in some marine algae and prokaryotes. This could mean that these are ancient genes that were lost in other organisms, or that a common ancestor acquired them through horizontal gene transfer.

=== Taxonomy ===
A consensus taxonomy of the deuterostomes is:

- Superphylum Deuterostomia
  - Phylum Chordata
    - Subphylum Cephalochordata (lancelets)
    - Clade Olfactores
      - Subphylum Tunicata (tunicates)
      - Subphylum Vertebrata
        - Infraphylum "Agnatha" (jawless fish, paraphyletic)
        - Infraphylum Gnathostomata (jawed vertebrates)
          - Class †"Acanthodii" (acanthodians, paraphyletic)
          - Class †"Placodermi" (placoderms, paraphyletic)
          - Class Chondrichthyes (cartilaginous fish)
          - Clade Osteichthyes (bony fish - includes tetrapods)
  - Clade Ambulacraria
    - Phylum Hemichordata
      - Class Enteropneusta (acorn worms)
      - Class Planctosphaeroidea (Note: Often considered part of Enteropneusta)
      - Class Pterobranchia
    - Phylum Echinodermata
      - Subphylum Asterozoa
        - Class Asteroidea (sea stars)
        - Class Ophiuroidea (brittle stars)
      - Subphylum †Blastozoa
      - Subphylum Crinozoa (sea lilies and extinct relatives)
      - Subphylum Echinozoa
        - Echinoidea (sea urchins)
        - Holothuroidea (sea cucumbers)

There is a possibility that Ambulacraria is the sister clade to Xenacoelomorpha and could form the Xenambulacraria group, but recent transcriptome analyses concluded that the phylum Xenacoelomorpha is the sister group to the Nephrozoa, which includes both the protostomes and the deuterostomes, making the phylum the basalmost bilaterian clade. This would mean they are neither deuterostomes nor protostomes.

== Characteristics ==
Early development differences between deuterostomes versus protostomes. In deuterostomes, blastula divisions occur as radial cleavage because they occur parallel or perpendicular to the major polar axis. In protostomes, the cleavage is spiral because division planes are oriented obliquely to the polar major axis. During gastrulation, deuterostome embryos' anus is given first by the blastopore while the mouth is formed secondarily, and vice versa for the protostomes.

In deuterostomes, the developing embryo's first opening, the blastopore, becomes the anus, while the gut eventually tunnels through the embryo until it reaches the other side, forming an opening that becomes the mouth. This distinguishes them from protostomes, which have a variety of patterns of development.

In both deuterostomes and protostomes, a zygote first develops into a hollow ball of cells, called a blastula. In deuterostomes, the early divisions occur parallel or perpendicular to the polar axis. This is called radial cleavage, and it also occurs in certain protostomes, such as the lophophorates.

Most deuterostomes display indeterminate cleavage, in which the developmental fate of the cells in the developing embryo is not determined by the identity of the parent cell. Thus, if the first four cells are separated, each can develop into a complete small larva; and if a cell is removed from the blastula, the other cells will compensate. This is the source of identical twins.

The mesoderm forms as evaginations of the developed gut that pinch off to form the coelom. This process is called enterocoely.

Another feature present in both the Hemichordata and Chordata is pharyngotremy — the presence of spiracles or gill slits into the pharynx, which is also found in some primitive fossil echinoderms (mitrates).

A hollow nerve cord is found in all chordates, including tunicates (in the larval stage). Some hemichordates also have a tubular nerve cord. In the early embryonic stage, it looks like the hollow nerve cord of chordates.

Both the hemichordates and the chordates have a thickening of the aorta, homologous to the chordate heart, which contracts to pump blood. This suggests a presence in the deuterostome ancestor of the three groups, with the echinoderms having secondarily lost it.

The highly modified nervous system of echinoderms obscures much about their ancestry, but several facts suggest that all present deuterostomes evolved from a common ancestor that had pharyngeal gill slits, a hollow nerve cord, circular and longitudinal muscles, and a segmented body.

== Origins and evolution ==
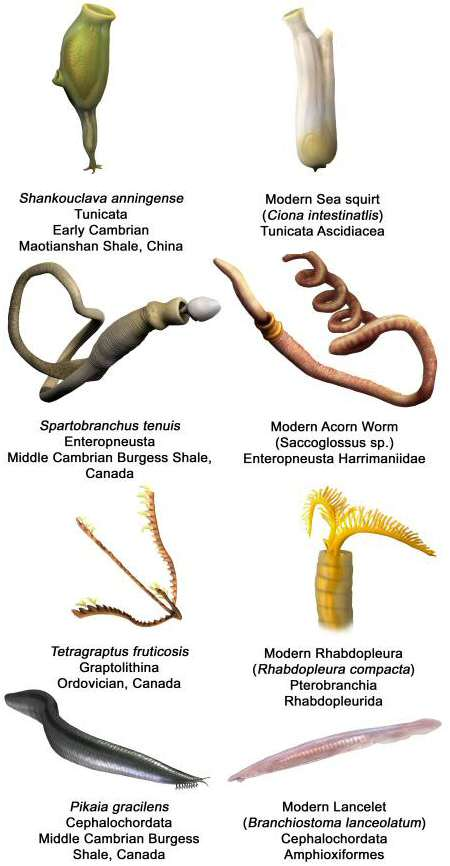
Early deuterostomes and their modern counterparts

Bilateria, one of the five major lineages of animals, is split into two groups: the protostomes and deuterostomes. Deuterostomes consist of chordates (which include the vertebrates) and ambulacrarians. It seems likely that the 555 million year old Kimberella was a member of the protostomes. That implies that the protostome and deuterostome lineages split long before Kimberella appeared, and hence well before the start of the Cambrian 538.8 million years ago, i.e. during the earlier part of the Ediacaran Period (around 635-539 Mya, around the end of global Marinoan glaciation in the late Neoproterozoic). It has been proposed that the ancestral deuterostome, before the chordate/ambulacrarian split, could have been a chordate-like animal with a terminal anus and pharyngeal openings but no gill slits, with an active suspension feeding strategy.

The last common ancestor of the deuterostomes had lost all innexin diversity.

=== Fossil record ===
Deuterostomes have a rich fossil record with thousands of fossil species being found throughout the Phanerozoic. There are also a few earlier fossils that may represent deuterostomes, but these remain debated. The earliest of these disputed fossils are the tunicate-like organisms Burykhia and Ausia from the Ediacaran period. While these may in fact be tunicates, others have interpreted them as cnidarians or sponges, and as such their true affinity remains uncertain. Another Ediacaran fossil, Arkarua, may represent the earliest echinoderm, while Yanjiahella from the early Cambrian (Fortunian) period is another notable stem group echinoderm.

Fossils of one major deuterostome group, the echinoderms (whose modern members include sea stars, sea urchins and crinoids), are quite common from the start of Stage 3 of the Cambrian, 521 million years ago, starting with forms such as Helicoplacus. Two other Cambrian Stage 3 (521-514 mya) species, Haikouichthys and Myllokunmingia from the Chengjiang biota, are the earliest body fossils of fish, whereas Pikaia, discovered much earlier but from the Mid Cambrian Burgess Shale, is now regarded as a primitive chordate. The Mid Cambrian fossil Rhabdotubus johanssoni has been interpreted as a pterobranch hemichordate, whereas Spartobranchus is an acorn-worm from the Burgess Shale, providing proof that all main lineages were already well established 508 mya.

On the other hand, fossils of early chordates are very rare, as non-vertebrate chordates have no bone tissue or teeth, and no post-Cambrian non-vertebrate chordate fossils are known aside from the Permian-aged Paleobranchiostoma, trace fossils of the Ordovician colonial tunicate Catellocaula, and various Jurassic-aged and Tertiary-aged spicules tentatively attributed to ascidians. Fossils of Echinodermata are very common after the Cambrian. Except for graptolites, fossils of Hemichordata are less common until the Lower Carboniferous.

=== Phylogeny ===
Deuterostomes have long been considered one of the principal monophyletic clades of bilaterian animals. However, recent phylogenomic analyses have questioned this interpretation. Deep relationships among the major bilaterian lineages may remain unresolved. The ancestral deuterostome was most likely a benthic worm that possessed a cartilaginous skeleton, a central nervous system, and gill slits.

- Nephrozoa
  - Deuterostomia
    - Chordata
      - Cephalochordata
      - Olfactores
        - Tunicata
        - Vertebrata
    - Ambulacraria
      - Echinodermata
      - Hemichordata
        - Pterobranchia
        - Enteropneusta
  - Protostomia
