= Trezona Formation =

Geologic formation in South Australia

- Stratigraphic range: late Cryogenian – early Ediacaran; ~664.7–570 Ma
- Type: Formation
- Unit of: Upalinna Subgroup
- Sub-units: See: Members
- Underlies: (Unconformably): Yaltipena Formation; Elatina Formation
- Overlies: Enorama Formation

Lithology
- Primary: Packstone
- Other: Grainstone, Limestone, Siltstone, Mudstone, Clay, Sandstone

Location
- Region: South Australia
- Country: Australia

The Trezona Formation is a Cryogenian to Ediacaran aged geological formation in the central Flinders Ranges of South Australia. It contains a number of fossiliferous beds, as well as a large carbon anomaly.

== Geology ==
The formation is predominately composed of red bioclastic packstones, stromatolite bioherms within limestone, calcareous siltstone, and oolitic grainstones. The bioclasts themselves are dune-cross-stratified between the larger stromatolite bioherms, and are notably diverse, containing probable microbial clasts ranging from flakes of stromatolite laminae, to ripped-up and rolled-up sediments with enhanced cohesion due to microbial mats.

=== Members ===
The Trezona Formation is composed of two, informal, members. They are as follows, in ascending stratigraphic order (lowest to highest):

- Siliciclastic member: This member is further divided into "upper" and "lower" sections. The lower section of the member is predominately composed of fine-grained siliciclastic and carbonate sediments. At the based of this lower section, is a thick laminae bed of cuspate stromatolites, which also contains rare columnar stromatolites. This layer is then overlain by a multitude of gray-green to red-brown mudstone and clay layers all the way to the top of the lower section, which slowly transitions from finely laminated layers to layers inter-bedded with silt and occasional fine-grained sand towards the top, before finally becoming calcareous mudstone. The upper section of the member is composed of again of fine-grained siliciclastic and carbonate sediments, also more mixed than the lower section. Within this mix there can be found the fine-grained grainstones of the formation, which are cross-bedded with intra-clastic packstone-grainstones, as well as containing fine-grained sandstone, with a higher presence columnar and domal stromatolites, whilst cuspate stromatolites become notably rarer.
- Carbonate member: This member is composed primarily of mixture of siliciclastic and carbonate sediments, with a notable increase of the carbonate rocks. Cuspate stromatolites become rarer still within this member. The base of the member is composed of red-gray calcareous mudstone, which is inter-bedded with low relief, longitudinal, and domal-columnar stromatolites, as well as intra-clastic grainstone. Towards the top of the member, the richness of carbonate rocks increase greatly, with blue-brown limestone beds, composed of columnar and domal stromatolites bioherms. Oolitic grainstone can also be found in the upper sections, and is commonly found in association with the stromatolite bioherms.

It conformably overlies the green shale dominated Enorama Formation, whilst it unconformably underlies the glacial Elatina Formation. In a small area of the Trezona Formation, it is overlain instead by the red clastic Yaltipena Formation.

== Carbon Anomaly ==
The formation contains evidence of what is known as the "Trezona Anomaly", which takes its name from this formation. The Trezona Anomaly takes place after what is referred to as the "Keele Peak", and precedes the Marinoan glaciation near the end of the Cryogenian, and contains a notable rise of —δ^{13}C, with values reaching up to >9%, making it the largest known δ^{13}C excursion in Earth's history. This anomaly is also found in Namibia, Norway, Scotland, Alaska and Canada.

== Fossils ==
Whilst the general flora of the Cryogenian aged beds is composed of various stromatolites and other cyanobacteria, an abundance of small three-dimensional fossils have been found. Whilst majority of these fossils are not identical to one another, all still share common traits, such as attaining centimetre-scale sizes, being generally ellipsoidal in shape and containing a number of interconnected canals within the fossils, some up to 1 mm (0.0 in) in diameter. The fossils remain unnamed, although they are inferred to possibly be sponge-grade organisms, being compared to the Ediacaran aged Palaeophragmodictya, also from Australia, and based on biomarkers found within similarly aged rocks within the area.

Other researchers have noted that the sponge affinity may be unlikely, as the Trezona fossils do not contain characteristics seen in modern day sponges, and the fact that such characteristics may not have evolved at such an early point, being 90 million years older than the aforementioned Palaeophragmodictya. A later study noted that a microbial or even mud chip origin for the Trezona fossils is also possible, and would go on to discount the sponge affinities also, noting a more likely affinity with Calcimicrobes for the true fossils, which are commonly found in rocks of a similar age. This was further backed up when researchers noted in a study that the sampled biomarkers do not provide enough evidence that the Trezona fossils are animals, let alone sponges.

== See also ==
- Neoproterozoic-related topics
