= Organogenesis =

Phase of embryonic development

Organogenesis is the phase of embryonic development that starts at the end of gastrulation and continues until birth. During organogenesis, the three germ layers formed from gastrulation (the ectoderm, endoderm, and mesoderm) form the tissues and internal organs of the organism.

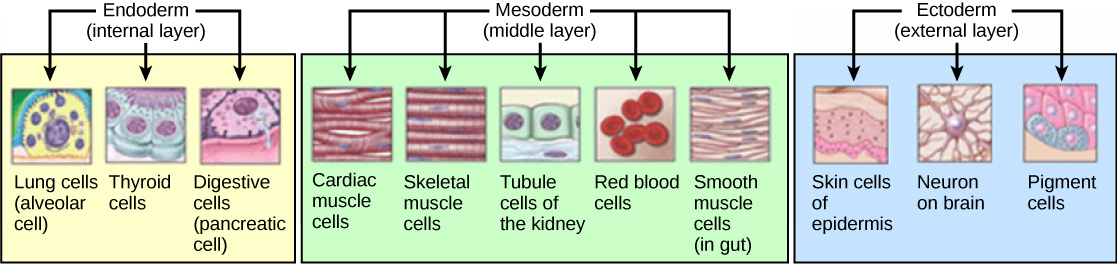
The endoderm of vertebrates produces tissue within the lungs, thyroid, and pancreas. The mesoderm aids in the production of cardiac muscle, skeletal muscle, smooth muscle, tissues within the kidneys, and red blood cells. The ectoderm produces tissues within the epidermis and aids in the formation of neurons within the brain, and melanocytes.

The cells of each of the three germ layers undergo differentiation, a process where less-specialized cells become more-specialized through the expression of a specific set of genes. Cell differentiation is driven by cell signaling cascades. Differentiation is influenced by juxtacrine, paracrine, and autocrine signaling. Juxtacrine signaling is exchanged between adjacent cells. Paracrine signals are sent by one cell and received by neighboring cells over short distances. Autocrine signaling is due to intracellular signals being produced and received by the same cell. These signaling pathways allow for cell rearrangement and ensure that organs form at specific sites within the organism at the correct time during development. The organogenesis process can be studied using embryos of various model organisms like zebrafish, xenopus, chickens, and mice. Studying human embryos is difficult and faces ethical concerns, but can be done using organoids developed in vitro without the use of a human embryo. Organoids are simplified organ structures made from adult stem cells, embryonic stem cells, or induced pluripotent stem cells. These stem cells differentiate into various organs due to interactions with other cells or the matrix they are grown on.

== Organs produced by the germ layers ==
The endoderm is the inner most germ layer of the embryo which gives rise to gastrointestinal and respiratory organs by forming epithelial linings and organs such as the liver, lungs, and pancreas. The mesoderm or middle germ layer of the embryo will form the blood, heart, kidney, muscles, and connective tissues. The ectoderm or outermost germ layer of the developing embryo forms the epidermis of the skin, the brain, and the nervous system.

== Mechanism of organ formation ==
Early studies of organogenesis were heavily influenced by the findings of Caspar Friedrich Wolff, Heinz Christian Pander, and Karl Ernst von Baer in the early 1800s. Wolff's idea that the development of organs is simply due to the rhythmic folding and arrest of membranes was the foundation of future discoveries. Pander later expanded on this idea in the 1820s by discovering the three germ layers and their mechanism of development into organs. He noted that each germ layer is differentiated due to interactions with surrounding tissues. Later in 1828, Von Baer described Wolff's idea of the movement of membranes in greater detail and compared the development of different species. Von Baer's laws of embryology discuss how dissimilar species appear to be more alike while they are embryos and how during development, an organism's features go from more generalized to more specified. In humans, internal organs begin to develop within 3–8 weeks after fertilization. The germ layers form organs by three processes: folds, splits, and condensation. Folds form in the germinal sheet of cells and usually form an enclosed tube which you can see in the development of vertebrates neural tube. Splits or pockets may form in the germinal sheet of cells forming vesicles or elongations. The lungs and glands of the organism may develop this way.

Formation of the neural tube. During neurulation, the notochord directs the neural plate to fold inward and form a tube. This separates the ectoderm into the epidermis and the neural tube. The remaining cells from the ectoderm become neural crest cells that migrate to other areas of the embryo. The neural tube will form the central nervous system later in development.

=== Neurulation ===
A primary step in organogenesis for chordates is the development of the notochord, which induces the formation of the neural plate, and ultimately the neural tube in vertebrate development. Neurulation, the process of developing the neural tube from the ectoderm, occurs directly after gastrulation. The embryo in this phase is called the neurula. In humans, this process occurs around week 3 of gestation. There are three kinds of neurulation: primary, secondary, and junctional neurulation. Primary neurulation forms the anterior portion of the neural tube in most vertebrates. It is due to the edges of the neural plate turning upwards to form neural folds and a neural groove. The neural folds then come together and fuse. In secondary neurulation, mesenchymal cells migrate underneath the epidermis to form the neural tube. This typically forms the posterior end of the neural tube. Junctional neurulation occurs in the transition zone between primary and secondary neurulation and contains developmental characteristics of both. In the transition zone, the neural tube is formed by both the folding of the neural plate and from the migration of mesenchymal cells. The final step of neurulation is the closure of the neural tube and its separation from the epidermis. Failure of the neural tube to close can cause neural tube defects such as spina bifida and anencephaly. The development of the neural tube will give rise to the brain and spinal cord. Vertebrates develop a neural crest that differentiates into many structures, including bones, muscles, and components of the central nervous system. Neural crest cells transition from sheet-like epithelial cells to mobile mesenchymal cells. This transition allows them to migrate to other areas of the embryo. The coelom of the body forms from a split of the mesoderm along the somite axis.

== Plant organogenesis ==
Organogenesis in plants occurs continuously and only stops when the plant dies. In the shoot, the shoot apical meristems regularly produce new lateral organs (leaves, flowers, or fruits) and lateral branches. In the root, new lateral roots form from weakly differentiated internal tissue (e.g. the xylem-pole pericycle in the model plant Arabidopsis thaliana). In vitro and in response to specific cocktails of hormones (mainly auxins and cytokinins), most plant tissues can de-differentiate and form a mass of dividing totipotent stem cells called a callus. Organogenesis can then occur from those cells. The type of organ that is formed depends on the relative concentrations of the hormones in the medium. Plant organogenesis can be induced in tissue culture and used to regenerate plants.

== See also ==
- Ectoderm
- Embryogenesis
- Endoderm
- Eye development
- Gastrulation
- Germ layer
- Germ line development
- Gonadogenesis
- Heart development
- Histogenesis
- Limb development
- List of human cell types derived from the germ layers
- Mesoderm
- Morphogenesis
- Organoid
