= Consumer (food chain) =

Living creatures that eat organisms from a different population

A consumer in a food chain is a living creature that eats organisms from a different population. A consumer is a heterotroph and a producer is an autotroph. Like sea angels, they take in organic moles by consuming other organisms, so they are commonly called consumers. Heterotrophs can be classified by what they usually eat as herbivores, carnivores, omnivores, or decomposers. On the other hand, autotrophs are organisms that use energy directly from the sun or from chemical bonds. Autotrophs are vital to all ecosystems because all organisms need organic molecules, and only autotrophs can produce them from inorganic compounds. Autotrophs are classified as either photoautotrophs (which get energy from the sun, like plants) or chemoautotrophs (which get energy from chemical bonds, like certain bacteria).

Consumers are typically viewed as predatory animals such as meat-eaters. However, herbivorous animals and parasitic fungi are also consumers. To be a consumer, an organism does not necessarily need to be carnivorous; it could only eat plants (producers), in which case it would be located in the first level of the food chain above the producers. Some carnivorous plants, like the Venus flytrap, are classified as both a producer and a consumer. Consumers are therefore anything that eats; hence the word consume which means to eat.

== Levels of the food chain ==
Within an ecological food chain, consumers are categorized into primary consumers, secondary consumers, and tertiary consumers.

- Primary consumers are herbivores, feeding on plants or algae. Caterpillars, insects, grasshoppers, termites and hummingbirds are all examples of primary consumers because they only eat autotrophs (plants). There are certain primary consumers that are called specialists because they only eat one type of producers. An example is the koala, because it feeds only on eucalyptus leaves. Primary consumers that feed on many kinds of plants are called generalists.
- Secondary consumers are small/medium-sized carnivores that prey on herbivorous animals. Omnivores, which feed on both plants and animals, can be considered as being both primary and secondary consumers.
- Tertiary consumers, which are sometimes also known as apex predators, are hypercarnivorous or omnivorous animals usually at the top of food chains, capable of feeding on both secondary consumers and primary consumers. Tertiary consumers are usually the largest, strongest and most aggressive animal in the local environment. Both secondary and tertiary consumers must hunt for their food, so they are collectively referred to as predators. Humans are an example of a tertiary consumer.

== Importance to the ecosystem ==
In an ecosystem, energy is transferred from level to another as food. A balance in these transfers is vital to the health and stability of an ecosystem. Consumers balance the food chain in an ecosystem by keeping plant populations at a reasonable number. Without proper balance, an ecosystem can collapse and cause the decline of all affected species. This will lead to a severely disrupted ecosystem and a nonfunctional consumer web. In addition, there will be a change in climate, which can further worsen the ecosystem and affect the air quality and water.

== See also ==
- Food web
- Primary producers
- Trophic level
