= Triploblasty =

State of having three germ layers in embryonic development

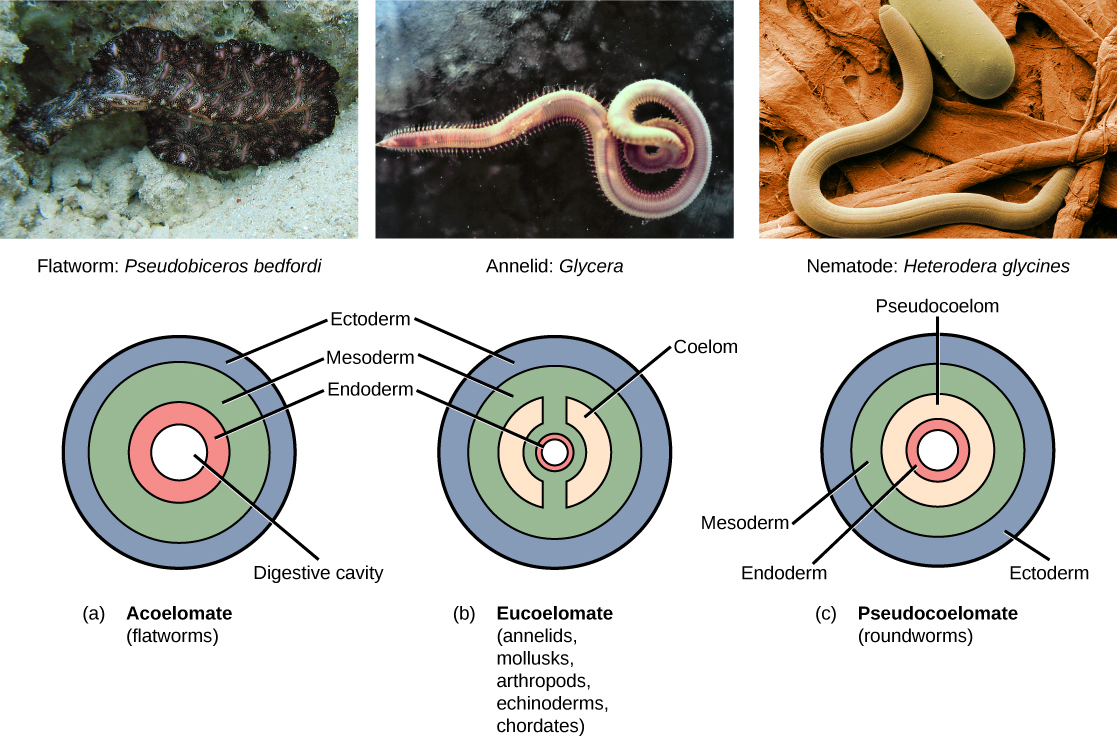
Classification of tripoblasts based on body cavities

Triploblasty is a condition of the gastrula in which there are three primary germ layers: the ectoderm, mesoderm, and endoderm. Germ cells are set aside in the embryo at the blastula stage, and are incorporated into the gonads during organogenesis. The germ layers form during the gastrulation of the blastula. The term triploblast may refer to any egg cell in which the blastoderm splits into three layers.

All bilaterians, which are the animals with bilaterally symmetrical embryos, are triploblastic. Other animal taxa, namely the ctenophores, placozoans, and cnidarians, are diploblastic, which means that their embryos contain only two germ layers. Sponges are even less developmentally specialized, because they lack both true tissues and organs.

The earliest triploblasts are thought to have evolved from the diploblasts at some time during the Proterozoic era, establishing themselves as a group prior to their diversification during the Cambrian explosion.

== See also ==
- Embryo – Multicellular diploid eukaryote in its earliest stage of development
- Eumetazoa – Basal animal clade as a sister group of the Porifera
