= Germ layer =

Primary layer of cells in embryonic development

A germ layer, primary germinal layer, or germinal layer is a primary layer of cells that forms during animal embryonic development. Germ layers form during gastrulation, when the early embryo is formed of two or three layers of cells.

Sponges do not have a gastrulation stage and possess no true germ layers. They do though have two layers of cells separated by a gel-like mesohyl. Some aquatic invertebrates such as cnidarians, and comb jellies, develop from only two germ layers, an ectoderm and an endoderm, and are known as diploblasts. But most animals have a bilateral symmetry, and develop from three germ layers, an ectoderm, endoderm, and a middle layer of mesoderm, and are triploblastic.

Germ layers eventually give rise to all of an animal's tissues and organs through the processes of histogenesis, and organogenesis.

== History ==
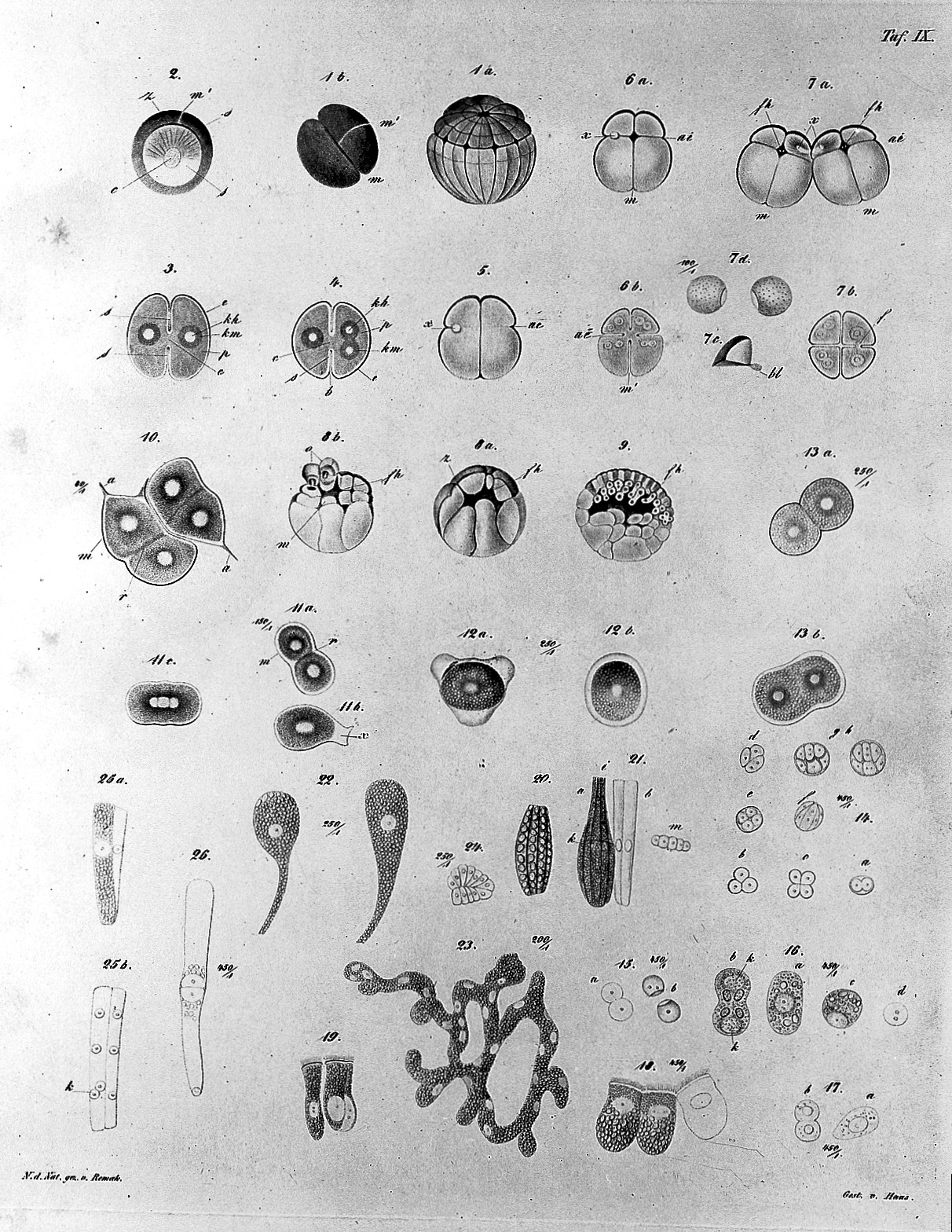
Cleavage and division of the cell of an egg of a vertebrate (Remak, 1855).

Caspar Friedrich Wolff observed organization of the early embryo in leaf-like layers. In 1817, Heinz Christian Pander discovered three primordial germ layers while studying chick embryos. Between 1850 and 1855, Robert Remak had further refined the germ cell layer (Keimblatt) concept, stating that the external, internal and middle layers form respectively the epidermis, the gut, and the intervening musculature and vasculature. The term "mesoderm" was introduced into English by Thomas Henry Huxley in 1871, and "ectoderm" and "endoderm" by Lankester in 1873.

== Evolution ==
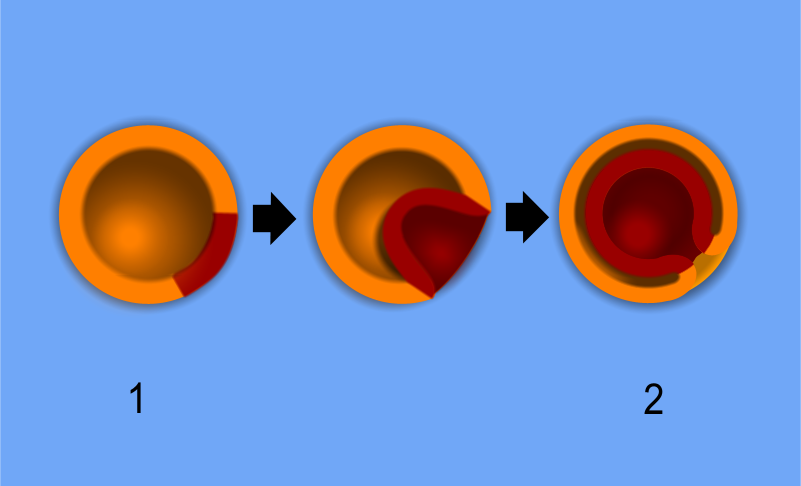
Gastrulation of a diploblast: The formation of germ layers from a (1) blastula to a (2) gastrula. Some of the ectoderm cells (orange) move inward forming the endoderm (red).

Among animals, sponges do not have a gastrula stage and have no true germ layers, though they do have two layers of cells separated by a middle gel-like layer the mesohyl. Diploblastic animals, Cnidaria and Ctenophora, show an increase in compartmentalization, and have two germ layers, the endoderm and ectoderm. Diploblastic animals are organized into recognisable tissues. All other animals are bilaterian and triploblasts having a third middle layer of mesoderm between the other two. Triploblastic animals develop recognizable organs.

== Development ==
Fertilization leads to the formation of a zygote. During the next stage, cleavage, mitotic cell divisions transform the zygote into a hollow ball of cells, a blastula. This early embryonic form undergoes gastrulation, forming a gastrula with either two or three layers (the germ layers). In all vertebrates, these progenitor cells differentiate into all adult tissues and organs.

In the human embryo, after about three days, the zygote forms a solid mass of cells by mitotic division, called a morula. This then changes to a blastocyst, consisting of an outer layer called a trophoblast, and an inner cell mass called the embryoblast. Filled with uterine fluid, the blastocyst breaks out of the zona pellucida and undergoes implantation. The inner cell mass initially has two layers: the hypoblast and epiblast. At the end of the second week, a primitive streak appears. The epiblast in this region moves towards the primitive streak, dives down into it, and forms a new layer, called the endoderm, pushing the hypoblast out of the way (this goes on to form the amnion.) The epiblast keeps moving and forms a second layer, the mesoderm. The top layer is now called the ectoderm.

Gastrulation occurs in reference to the primary body axis. Germ layer formation is linked to the primary body axis as well, however it is less reliant on it than gastrulation is. Hydractinia shows that germ layer formation that transpires as a mixed delamination.

In mice, germ layer differentiation is controlled by two transcription factors: Sox2 and Oct4 proteins. These transcription factors cause the pluripotent mouse embryonic stem cells to select a germ layer fate. Sox2 promotes ectodermal differentiation, while Oct4 promotes mesendodermal differentiation. Each gene inhibits what the other promotes. Amounts of each protein are different throughout the genome, causing the embryonic stem cells to select their fate.

== The three germ layers ==
=== Endoderm ===
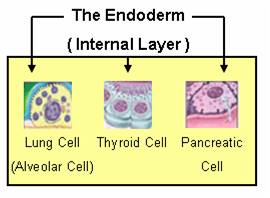
The endoderm produces tissue within the lungs, thyroid, and pancreas.

The endoderm is one of the germ layers formed during animal embryonic development. Cells migrate inward along the archenteron to form the inner layer of the gastrula, developing into the endoderm.

The endoderm consists at first of flattened cells, which subsequently become columnar. It forms the epithelial lining of the whole of the digestive tract except part of the mouth and pharynx and the terminal part of the rectum (which are lined by involutions of the ectoderm). It also forms the lining cells of all the glands which open into the digestive tract, including those of the liver and pancreas; the epithelium of the auditory tube and tympanic cavity; the trachea, bronchi, and alveoli of the lungs; the bladder and part of the urethra; and the follicle lining of the thyroid gland and thymus.

The endoderm forms the pharynx, the esophagus, the stomach, the small intestine, the colon, the liver, the pancreas, the bladder, the epithelial parts of the trachea and bronchi, the lungs, the thyroid, and the parathyroid.

=== Mesoderm ===
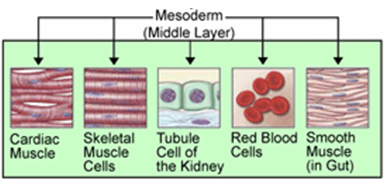
The mesoderm aids in the production of cardiac muscle, skeletal muscle, smooth muscle, tissues within the kidneys, and red blood cells.

The mesoderm germ layer forms in the embryo of a triploblastic animal. During gastrulation, some of the cells migrating inward contribute to the mesoderm, an additional layer between the endoderm and the ectoderm. The formation of a mesoderm leads to the development of the coelom, the main body cavity. Organs formed inside a coelom can freely move, grow, and develop independently of the body wall while fluid cushions, protects them from shocks.

The mesoderm has several components which develop into tissues: axial mesoderm, intermediate mesoderm, paraxial mesoderm, and lateral plate mesoderm. The axial mesoderm develops into the notochord. The intermediate mesoderm develops into kidneys and gonads. The paraxial mesoderm develops into cartilage, skeletal muscle, and dermis. The lateral plate mesoderm develops into the circulatory system (including the heart and spleen), the wall of the gut, and wall of the human body.

Through cell signaling cascades and interactions with the ectodermal and endodermal cells, the mesodermal cells begin the process of differentiation.

The mesoderm forms muscle tissue (smooth and striated), bone, cartilage, connective tissue, adipose tissue, circulatory system, lymphatic system, dermis, dentine of teeth, genitourinary system, serous membranes, spleen and notochord.

=== Ectoderm ===
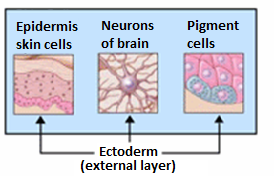
The ectoderm produces tissues within the epidermis, aids in the formation of neurons within the brain, and constructs melanocytes.

The ectoderm generates the outer layer of the embryo, and it forms from the embryo's epiblast. The ectoderm develops into the surface ectoderm, neural crest, and the neural tube.

The surface ectoderm develops into the epidermis, hair, nails, lens of the eye, sebaceous glands, cornea, tooth enamel, the epithelium of the mouth and nose.

The neural crest of the ectoderm develops into the peripheral nervous system, adrenal medulla, melanocytes, and facial cartilage.

The neural tube of the ectoderm develops into the brain, spinal cord, posterior pituitary, motor neurons, and retina. The anterior pituitary develops from the ectodermal tissue of Rathke's pouch.

==== Neural crest ====
Because of its great importance, the neural crest is sometimes considered a fourth germ layer. It is, however, derived from the ectoderm.

== See also ==
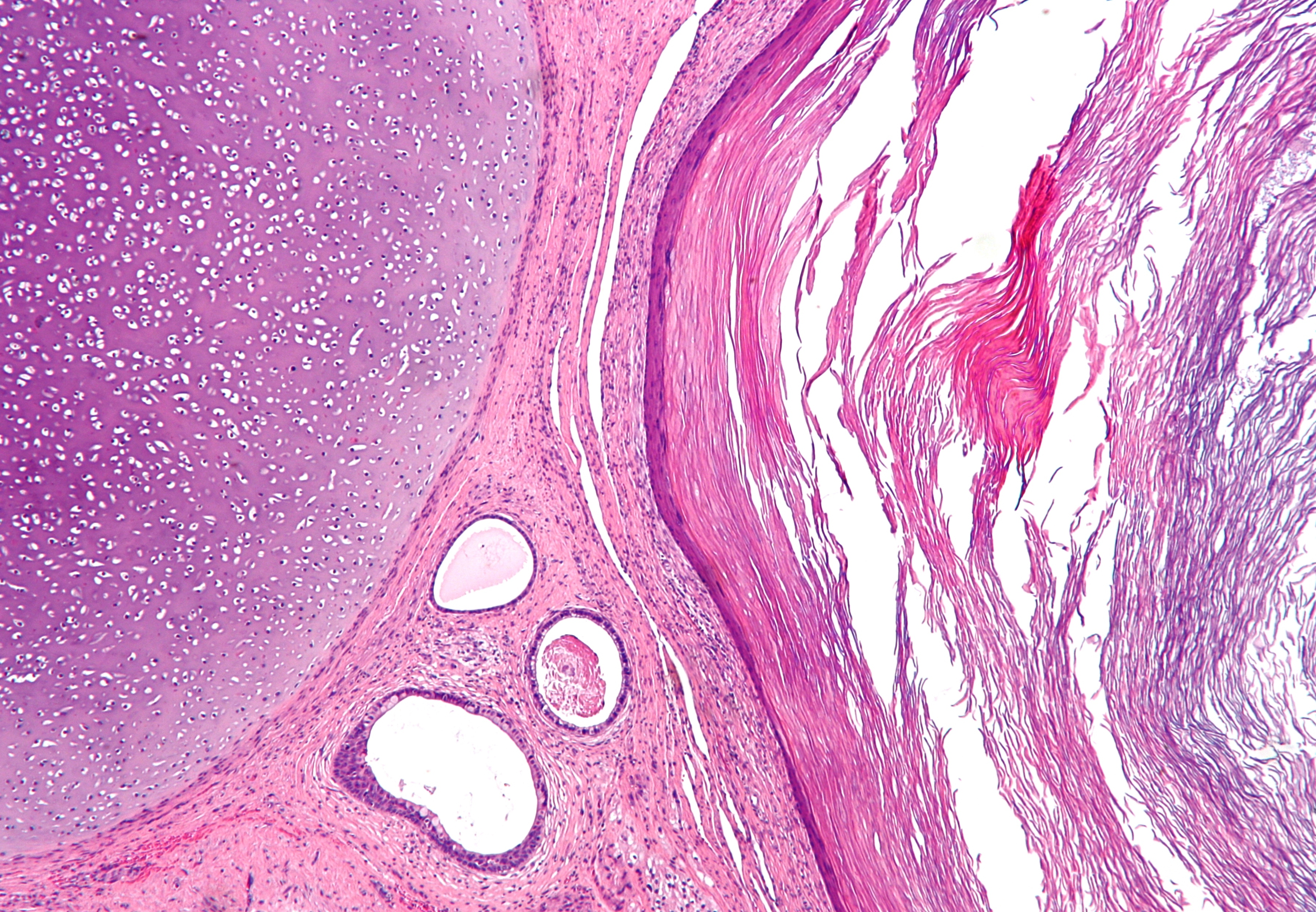
Micrograph of a teratoma, a tumour that characteristically has tissue from all three germ layers. The image shows tissue derived from the mesoderm (immature cartilage - left-upper corner of image), endoderm (gastrointestinal glands - center-bottom of image) and ectoderm (epidermis - right of image). H&E stain.

- Germ cell
- Neurulation
- List of human cell types derived from the germ layers
