= Endoderm =

Inner germ layer of embryonic development

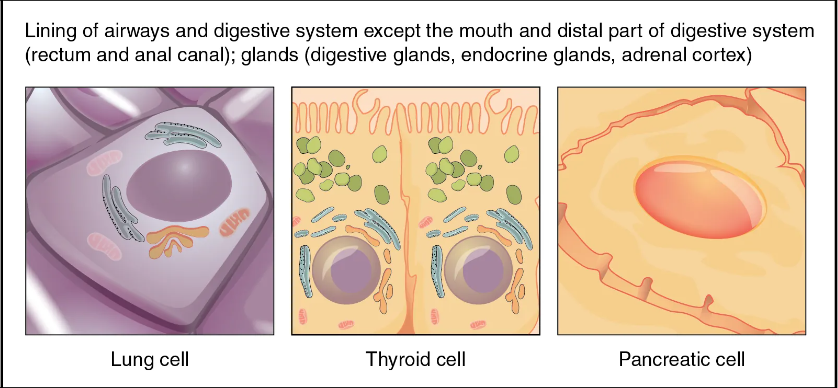
- Tissues derived from endoderm.

Details
- Days: 16
- Precursor: Epiblast

Identifiers
- MeSH: D004707
- FMA: 69071

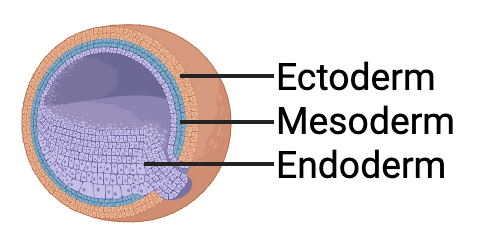
Visualization of the three germ layers of a gastrula.

Endoderm is the innermost of the three primary germ layers in the very early embryo. The other two layers are the ectoderm (outside layer) and mesoderm (middle layer). Cells migrating inward along the archenteron form the inner layer of the gastrula, which develops into the endoderm.

The endoderm consists at first of flattened cells, which subsequently become columnar. It forms the epithelial lining of multiple systems. The endoderm epithelium forms the respiratory and gastrointestinal tracts through nodal signaling.

In plant biology, endoderm corresponds to the innermost part of the cortex (bark) in young shoots and young roots often consisting of a single cell layer. As the plant becomes older, more endoderm will lignify.

== Formation of the Endoderm Layer ==
The endoderm is formed through the nodal signaling pathway. In all vertebrate species, it has been found that the development of the endoderm is at a high concentration of the nodal signaling gradient, whereas mesoderm development is at the side of low concentration of nodal signaling.

In humans, the endoderm can differentiate into distinguishable organs after 5 weeks of embryonic development.

== Production of Tissues ==
The following chart shows the tissues produced by the endoderm. The embryonic endoderm develops into the interior linings of two tubes in the body, the digestive and respiratory tube. Pattern formation allows the initial endoderm cells to form the organs involved in each of these systems. By forming these organs, the ability to absorb nutrients in the digestive tract and to exchange gases in the respiratory tract follows.

Layer	Category	System
General	Gastrointestinal tract	the entire alimentary canal except part of the mouth, pharynx and the terminal part of the rectum (which are lined by involutions of the ectoderm), the lining cells of all the glands which open into the digestive tube, including those of the liver and pancreas
General	Respiratory tract	the trachea, bronchi, and alveoli of the lungs
General	Endocrine glands and organs	the lining of the follicles of the thyroid gland and the epithelial component of the thymus (i.e. thymic epithelial cells).
	Auditory system	the epithelium of the auditory tube and tympanic cavity
	Urinary system	the urinary bladder and part of the urethra

Liver and pancreas cells are believed to derive from a common precursor.

== Additional images ==
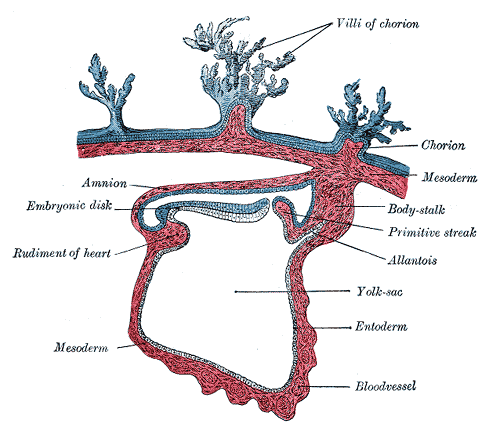
Section through the embryo.

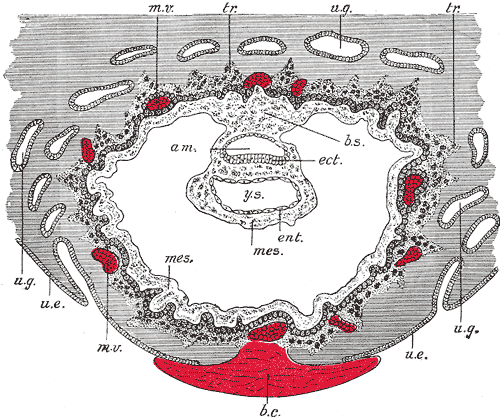
Section through ovum imbedded in the uterine decidua

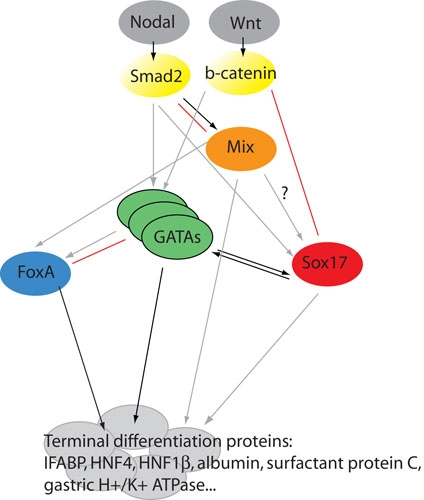
Signaling pathway to inducing endoderm

== See also ==
- Hypoblast of primitive endoderm
- Ectoderm
- Germ layer
- Histogenesis
- Mesoderm
- Organogenesis
- Endodermal sinus tumor
- Gastrulation
- Cell differentiation
- Triploblasty
- List of human cell types derived from the germ layers
