= Development of the nervous system in humans =

Mechanisms that form the human nervous system

The development of the nervous system in humans, or neural development, or neurodevelopment involves the studies of embryology, developmental biology, and neuroscience. These describe the cellular and molecular mechanisms by which the complex nervous system forms in humans, develops during prenatal development, and continues to develop postnatally.

Some landmarks of neural development in the embryo include:

1. The formation and differentiation of neurons from stem cell precursors (neurogenesis)
2. The migration of immature neurons from their birthplaces in the embryo to their final positions.
3. The outgrowth of axons from neurons and the guidance of the motile growth cone through the embryo towards postsynaptic partners.
4. The generation of synapses between axons and their postsynaptic partners.
5. The synaptic pruning that occurs in adolescence.
6. The lifelong changes in synapses which are thought to underlie learning and memory.

Typically, these neurodevelopmental processes can be broadly divided into two classes:

1. Activity-independent mechanisms. Activity-independent mechanisms are generally believed to occur as hardwired processes determined by genetic programs that are played out within individual neurons. These include differentiation, migration, and axon guidance to their initial target areas. These processes are thought of as being independent of neural activity and sensory experience.
2. Activity-dependent mechanisms. Once axons reach their target areas, activity-dependent mechanisms come into play. Neural activity and sensory experience will mediate formation of new synapses, as well as synaptic plasticity, which will be responsible for refinement of the nascent neural circuits.

== Development of the human brain ==
Highly schematic flowchart of human brain development

=== Overview ===
The central nervous system (CNS) is derived from the ectoderm—the outermost tissue layer of the embryo. In the third week of human embryonic development the neuroectoderm appears and forms the neural plate along the dorsal side of the embryo. The neural plate is the source of the majority of neurons and glial cells of the CNS. A groove forms along the long axis of the neural plate and, by week four of development, the neural plate wraps in on itself to give rise to the neural tube, which is filled with cerebrospinal fluid (CSF). As the embryo develops, the anterior part of the neural tube forms three primary brain vesicles, which become the primary anatomical regions of the brain: the forebrain (prosencephalon), midbrain (mesencephalon), and hindbrain (rhombencephalon). These simple, early vesicles enlarge and further divide into the five secondary brain vesicles – the telencephalon (future cerebral cortex and basal ganglia), diencephalon (future thalamus and hypothalamus), mesencephalon (future colliculi), metencephalon (future pons and cerebellum), and myelencephalon (future medulla). The CSF-filled central chamber is continuous from the telencephalon to the spinal cord, and constitutes the developing ventricular system of the CNS. Because the neural tube gives rise to the brain and spinal cord any mutations at this stage in development can lead to fatal deformities like anencephaly or lifelong disabilities like spina bifida. During this time, the walls of the neural tube contain neural stem cells, which drive brain growth as they divide many times. Gradually some of the cells stop dividing and differentiate into neurons and glial cells, which are the main cellular components of the CNS. The newly generated neurons migrate to different parts of the developing brain to self-organize into different brain structures. Once the neurons have reached their regional positions, they extend axons and dendrites, which allow them to communicate with other neurons via synapses. Synaptic communication between neurons leads to the establishment of functional neural circuits that mediate sensory and motor processing, and underlie behavior.

A 2026 study presented evidence that the human brain develops as two separate organs that come to function as one. According to this model, there are two distinct progenitor cell lineages within the early neuroectoderm. One lineage gives rise to the hindbrain and the other gives rise to the forebrain and midbrain. This developmental pattern appears to have arisen in the hemichordates and continued through evolution into humans.

=== Neural induction ===
During early embryonic development the ectoderm becomes specified to give rise to the epidermis (skin) and the neural plate. The conversion of undifferentiated ectoderm to neuro-ectoderm requires signals from the mesoderm. At the onset of gastrulation presumptive mesodermal cells move through the dorsal blastopore lip and form a layer in between the endoderm and the ectoderm. These mesodermal cells that migrate along the dorsal midline give rise to a structure called the notochord. Ectodermal cells overlying the notochord develop into the neural plate in response to a diffusible signal produced by the notochord. The remainder of the ectoderm gives rise to the epidermis (skin). The ability of the mesoderm to convert the overlying ectoderm into neural tissue is called neural induction.

The neural plate folds outwards during the third week of gestation to form the neural groove. Beginning in the future neck region, the neural folds of this groove close to create the neural tube. The formation of the neural tube from the ectoderm is called neurulation. The ventral part of the neural tube is called the basal plate; the dorsal part is called the alar plate. The hollow interior is called the neural canal. By the end of the fourth week of gestation, the open ends of the neural tube, called the neuropores, close off.

A transplanted blastopore lip can convert ectoderm into neural tissue and is said to have an inductive effect. Neural inducers are molecules that can induce the expression of neural genes in ectoderm explants without inducing mesodermal genes as well. Neural induction is often studied in xenopus embryos since they have a simple body pattern and there are good markers to distinguish between neural and non-neural tissue. Examples of neural inducers are the molecules noggin and chordin.

When embryonic ectodermal cells are cultured at low density in the absence of mesodermal cells they undergo neural differentiation (express neural genes), suggesting that neural differentiation is the default fate of ectodermal cells. In explant cultures (which allow direct cell-cell interactions) the same cells differentiate into epidermis. This is due to the action of BMP4 (a TGF-β family protein) that induces ectodermal cultures to differentiate into epidermis. During neural induction, noggin and chordin are produced by the dorsal mesoderm (notochord) and diffuse into the overlying ectoderm to inhibit the activity of BMP4. This inhibition of BMP4 causes the cells to differentiate into neural cells. Inhibition of TGF-β and BMP (bone morphogenetic protein) signaling can efficiently induce neural tissue from human pluripotent stem cells, a model of early human development.

=== The early brain ===
Late in the fourth week, the superior part of the neural tube flexes at the level of the future midbrain—the mesencephalon. Above the mesencephalon is the prosencephalon (future forebrain) and beneath it is the rhombencephalon (future hindbrain). The optical vesicle (which will eventually become the optic nerve, retina and iris) forms at the basal plate of the prosencephalon.

The spinal cord forms from the lower part of the neural tube. The wall of the neural tube consists of neuroepithelial cells, which differentiate into neuroblasts, forming the mantle layer (the gray matter). Nerve fibers emerge from these neuroblasts to form the marginal layer (the white matter). The ventral part of the mantle layer (the basal plates) forms the motor areas of the spinal cord, whilst the dorsal part (the alar plates) forms the sensory areas. Between the basal and alar plates is an intermediate layer that contains neurons of the autonomic nervous system.

In the fifth week, the alar plate of the prosencephalon expands to form the cerebral hemispheres (the telencephalon). The basal plate becomes the diencephalon.

The diencephalon, mesencephalon and rhombencephalon constitute the brain stem of the embryo. It continues to flex at the mesencephalon. The rhombencephalon folds posteriorly, which causes its alar plate to flare and form the fourth ventricle of the brain. The pons and the cerebellum form in the upper part of the rhombencephalon, whilst the medulla oblongata forms in the lower part.

The embryo's brain at four weeks

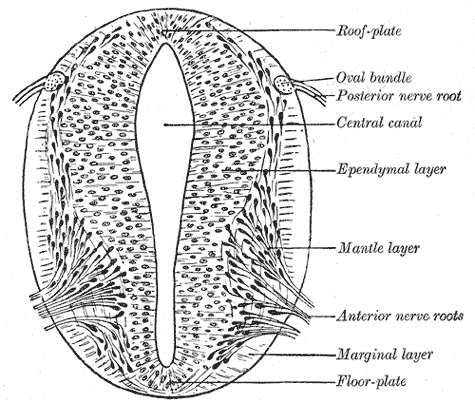
Cross-section of a developing spinal cord at four weeks

The embryo's nervous system at six weeks

== Neuroimaging ==
Neuroimaging is responsible for great advancements in understanding how the brain develops. EEG and ERP are effective imaging processes used mainly on babies and young children since they are more gentle. Infants are generally tested with fNIRS. The MRI and fMRI are widely used for research on the brain due to the quality of images and analysis possible from them.

=== Magnetic resonance imaging ===
MRI's are helpful in analyzing many aspects of the brain. The magnetization-transfer ratio (MTR) measures integrity using magnetization. Fractional anisotropy (FA) measures organization using the diffusion of water molecules. Additionally, mean diffusivity (MD) measures the strength of white matter tracts.

=== Structural magnetic resonance imaging ===
Using structural MRI, quantitative assessment of a number of developmental processes can be carried out including defining growth patterns, and characterizing the sequence of myelination. These data complement evidence from Diffusion Tensor Imaging (DTI) studies that have been widely used to investigate the development of white matter.

=== Functional magnetic resonance imaging ===
fMRI's test mentalising which is the theory of the mind by activating a network. The posterior superior temporal sulcus (pSTS) and temporo-parietal junction (TPJ) are helpful in predicting movement. In adults, the right pSTS showed greater response than the same region in adolescents when tested on intentional causality. These regions were also activated during the "mind in the eyes" exercise where emotion must be judged based on different images of eyes. Another key region is the anterior temporal cortex (ATC) in the posterior region. In adults, the left ATC showed greater response than the same region in adolescents when tested on emotional tests of mentalising. Finally, the medial prefrontal cortex (MPFC) and the anterior dorsal MPFC (dMPFC) are activated when the mind is stimulated by psychology.

=== Three-dimensional sonography ===
Higher resolution imaging has allowed three-dimensional ultrasound to help identify human brain development during the embryonic stages. Studies report that three primary structures are formed in the sixth gestational week. These are the forebrain, the midbrain, and the hindbrain, also known as the prosencephalon, mesencephalon, and the rhombencephalon respectively. Five secondary structures from these in the seventh gestational week. These are the telencephalon, diencephalon, mesencephalon, metencephalon, and myelencephalon which later become the lateral ventricles, third ventricles, aqueduct, and upper and lower parts of the fourth ventricle from the telencephalon to the myelencephalon, during adulthood. 3D ultrasound imaging allows in-vivo depictions of ideal brain development which can help to recognize irregularities during gestation.

==== White matter development ====
Using MRI, studies showed that while white matter increases from childhood (~9 years) to adolescence (~14 years), grey matter decreases. This was observed primarily in the frontal and parietal cortices. Theories as to why this occurs vary. One thought is that the intracortical myelination paired with increased axonal calibre increases the volume of white matter tissue. Another is that synaptic reorganization occurs from proliferation and then pruning.

==== Grey matter development ====
The rise and fall of the volume of grey matter in the frontal and parietal lobes peaked at ~12 years of age. The peak for the temporal lobes was ~17 years with the superior temporal cortex being last to mature. The sensory and motor regions matured first after which the rest of the cortex developed. This was characterized by loss of grey matter and it occurred from the posterior to the anterior region. This loss of grey matter and increase of white matter may occur throughout a lifetime though the more robust changes occur from childhood to adolescence.

== Neuronal migration ==
Neuronal migration is the method by which neurons travel from their origin or birthplace to their final position in the brain. Their most common means of migration are radial and tangential migration.

=== Radial migration ===
Neural stem cells proliferate in the ventricular zone of the developing neocortex. The first postmitotic cells to migrate from the preplate are destined to become Cajal–Retzius cells and subplate neurons. These cells migrate by somal translocation. Neurons migrating with this mode of locomotion are bipolar and attach the leading edge of the process to the pia. The soma is then transported to the pial surface by nucleokinesis, a process by which a microtubule "cage" around the nucleus elongates and contracts in association with the centrosome to guide the nucleus to its final destination. Radial fibres (also known as radial glia) can translocate to the cortical plate and differentiate either into astrocytes or neurons. Somal translocation can occur at any time during development.

Subsequent waves of neurons split the preplate by migrating along radial glial fibres to form the cortical plate. Each wave of migrating cells travel past their predecessors forming layers in an inside-out manner, meaning that the youngest neurons are the closest to the surface. It is estimated that glial guided migration represents 80-90% of migrating neurons.

=== Axophilic migration ===
Many neurons migrating along the anterior-posterior axis of the body use existing axon tracts to migrate along in a process called axophilic migration. An example of this mode of migration is in GnRH-expressing neurons, which make a long journey from their birthplace in the nose, through the forebrain, and into the hypothalamus. Many of the mechanisms of this migration have been worked out, starting with the extracellular guidance cues that trigger intracellular signaling. These intracellular signals, such as calcium signaling, lead to actin and microtubule cytoskeletal dynamics, which produce cellular forces that interact with the extracellular environment through cell adhesion proteins to cause the movement of these cells.

Neurophilic migration refers to the migration of neurons along an axon belonging to a different nerve. Gliophilic migration is the migration of glia along glial fibres.

=== Tangential migration ===
Most interneurons migrate tangentially through multiple modes of migration to reach their appropriate location in the cortex. An example of tangential migration is the movement of Cajal–Retzius cells within the marginal zone of the cortical neuroepithelium.

=== Others ===
There is also a method of neuronal migration called multipolar migration. This is seen in multipolar cells, which are abundantly present in the cortical intermediate zone. They do not resemble the cells migrating by locomotion or somal translocation. Instead these multipolar cells express neuronal markers and extend multiple thin processes in various directions independently of the radial glial fibers.

== Neurotrophic factors ==
Neurotrophic factors are molecules which promote and regulate neuronal survival in the developing nervous system. They are distinguished from ubiquitous metabolites necessary for cellular maintenance and growth by their specificity; each neurotrophic factor promotes the survival of only certain kinds of neurons during a particular stage of their development. In addition, it has been argued that neurotrophic factors are involved in many other aspects of neuronal development ranging from axonal guidance to regulation of neurotransmitter synthesis.

== Adult neural development ==
Neurodevelopment in the adult nervous system includes mechanisms such as remyelination, generation of new neurons, glia, axons, myelin or synapses. Neuroregeneration differs between the peripheral nervous system (PNS) and the central nervous system (CNS) by the functional mechanisms and especially, the extent and speed.

The nervous system continues to develop during adulthood until brain death. For example:

- physical exercise has neurobiological effects
- the consumption of foods (or nutrients), obesity, alterations of the microbiome, drinks, dietary supplements, recreational drugs and medications may possibly also have effects on the development of the nervous system
- various diseases, such as COVID-19, have effects on the development of the nervous system
  - For example, several genes have been identified as being associated with changes in brain structure over lifetime and are potential Alzheimer's disease therapy-targets.
- psychological events such as mental trauma and resilience-building
- exposure to environmental pollution and toxins such as air pollution may have effects on the further development of the nervous system
- other activities may also have effects on the development of the nervous system, such as lifelong learning, retraining, and types of media- and economic activities
- broadly, brain aging

Research, treatments and policies often distinguish between "mature" brains and "developing" brains while scientists have pointed out that "the complex nature of neurodevelopment itself poses challenges to establishing a point of reference that would indicate when a brain is mature" and that various structural brain measures change constantly throughout the adult phase of life, albeit childhood neuroplasticity-levels may not be reached again and it is thought that there are various critical and sensitive periods of brain development.

=== Differences to children's learning ===
Learning is often more efficient in children and takes longer or is more difficult with age. A study using neuroimaging identified rapid neurotransmitter GABA boosting as a major potential explanation-component for why that is.

Children's brains contain more "silent synapses" that are inactive until recruited as part of neuroplasticity and flexible learning or memories. Neuroplasticity is heightened during critical or sensitive periods of brain development, mainly referring to brain development during child development.

However researchers, after subjecting late middle aged participants to university courses, suggest perceived age differences in learning may be a result of differences in time, support, environment, and attitudes, rather than inherent ability.

What humans learn at the early stages, and what they learn to apply, sets humans on course for life or has a disproportional impact. Adults usually have a higher capacity to select what they learn, to what extent and how. For example, children may learn the given subjects and topics of school curricula via classroom blackboard-transcription handwriting, instead of being able to choose specific topics/skills or jobs to learn and the styles of learning. For instance, children may not have developed consolidated interests, ethics, interest in purpose and meaningful activities, knowledge about real-world requirements and demands, and priorities.

== Research ==
=== Spatio-temporal modeling of brain development ===
In early development (before birth and during the first few months), the brain undergoes more changes in size, shape and structure than at any other time in life. Improved understanding of cerebral development during this critical period is important for mapping normal growth, and for investigating mechanisms of injury associated with risk factors for maldevelopment such as premature birth. Hence, there is a need for dense coverage of this age range with a time-varying, age-dependent atlas. Such spatio-temporal atlases can accurately represent the dynamic changes occurring during early brain development, and can be used as a normative reference space.

During the fetal period, in addition to biochemical mechanisms (gradients of appropriate morphogens) and the electrical activity of neurons (at appropriate stages of development), the geometric conditions of the environment in which the brain, spinal cord, and peripheral nervous system develop are crucial for the formation of the nervous system. An example would be cranial malformations (e.g., craniosynostosis), which can affect the development of the nervous system.

Furthermore, large scale gene expression studies of different brain regions from early gestation to aging have been performed. This kind of data provides a unique insight into changes that happen in the brain during this long period. This approach showed that 86 per cent of the genes were expressed, and that 90 per cent of these were differentially regulated at the whole-transcript or exon level across brain regions and/or time. The majority of these spatio-temporal differences were detected before birth, with subsequent increases in similarity among regional transcriptomes.

Interareal differences exhibit a temporal hourglass pattern, dividing human neocortical development into three major phases. During the first phase, in the first six months after conception, general architecture of brain regions is largely formed by a burst of genetic activity, which is distinct for specific regions of the neocortex. This rush is followed by a sort of intermission beginning in the third trimester of pregnancy. During this period, most genes that are active in specific brain regions are quieted — except for genes that spur connections between all neocortex regions. Then in late childhood and early adolescence, the genetic orchestra begins again and helps subtly shape neocortex regions that progressively perform more specialized tasks, a process that continues into adulthood.

=== Embryonic brain development research ===
Approaches to investigate the organogenesis and early development of the human brain or nervous system include:

- Brain organoids and 'assembloids' (see also: Genetic factors of recent brain evolution)
- Synthetic embryos/embryo models
- Model animals
- Post-mortem studies
- Non-invasive in vivo imaging As of 2014 imaging in utero is not commonly done without strong medical arguments; in 2019 a study reported that "neuroimaging approaches have contributed significantly to our understanding of early brain development"

Human tissue inaccessibility has impeded molecular understanding of the formation of cognitive capacities. The placenta is researched as well.

Better understanding of the development may potentially enable insights into nervous system diseases, improving intelligence, and better protection against harmful impacts from identified factors of fetal development (potentially including from diseases of the mother, various events and xenobiotics).

=== Specific regions ===
Research has been able to make new discoveries for various parts of the brain thanks to the noninvasive imaging available.

- Medial Prefrontal Cortex (MPFC)

In this region, more activity is noted in adolescents than in adults when faced with tests on mentalising tasks as well as communicative and personal intent. Decreased activity from adolescence to adulthood. In a mentalising task employing animation, the dMPFC was more stimulated in adults while the ventral MPFC was more stimulated in children. They can be attributed to the use of objective strategy associated with the dMPFC. Theories for decrease in activity from adolescence to adulthood vary. One theory is that cognitive strategy becomes more automatic with age and another is that functional change occurs parallel to neuroanatomical change which is characterized by synaptogenesis and pruning.

The MPFC is an example of one specific region that has become better understood using current imaging techniques. Current research provides many more findings like this.

=== Early life stress ===
Early life stress is defined as exposure to circumstances during childhood that overwhelm a child's coping resources and lead to sustained periods of stress. Results from multiple studies indicate that the effects of early life stress on the developing brain are significant and include, but are not limited to the following: increased amygdala volume, decreased activity in frontal cortical and limbic brain structures, and altered white matter structures.

Early life stress is believed to produce changes in brain development by interfering with neurogenesis, synaptic production, and pruning of synapses and receptors. Interference with these processes could result in increased or decreased brain region volumes, potentially explaining the findings that early life stress is associated with increased amygdala volume and decreased anterior cingulate cortex volume.

From the literature, several important conclusions have been drawn. Brain areas that undergo significant post-natal development, such as those involved in memory and emotion are more vulnerable to effects of early life stress. For example, the hippocampus continues to develop after birth and is a structure that is affected by childhood maltreatment. Early life stress seems to interfere with the overproduction of synapses that is typical in childhood, but does not interfere with synaptic pruning in adolescence. This results in smaller hippocampal volumes, potentially explaining the association between early life stress and reduced hippocampal volume. This volume reduction may be associated with the emotion regulation deficits seen in those exposed to early life stress.

The amygdala is particularly vulnerable to early life stress. The amygdala also undergoes significant development during childhood, is structurally and functionally altered in individuals that have experienced early life stress, and is associated with the socioemotional difficulties linked with early life stress.

Receptor type is another consideration when determining whether or not a brain region is sensitive to the effects of early life stress. Brain regions with a high density of glucocorticoid receptors are especially vulnerable to the effects of early life stress, likely because glucocorticoids bind to these receptors during stress exposure, facilitating the development of survival responses at the cost of other important neural pathways. Some examples of brain regions with high glucocorticoid receptor density are the hippocampus and cerebellar vermis. Stress activates the HPA axis, and results in the production of glucocorticoids. Increased glucocorticoid production results in increased activation of these brain regions, facilitating the development of certain neural pathways at the cost of others.

Abnormalities in brain structure and function are often associated with deficits that may persist for years after the stress is removed, and may be a risk factor for future psychopathology. The brain regions most sensitive to early life stress are those undergoing developmental changes during the stress exposure. As a result, stress alters the developmental trajectory of that brain region, producing long-lasting alterations in structure and function.

Common types of early life stress that are documented include maltreatment, neglect, and previous institutionalization. Living in poverty has also been shown to similarly influence brain function.

== See also ==
- Human brain development timeline
- KCC2
- Neurodevelopmental disorders
- Neural Darwinism
- Pre- and perinatal psychology
