= Animal embryonic development =

Process by which animal embryos form and develop

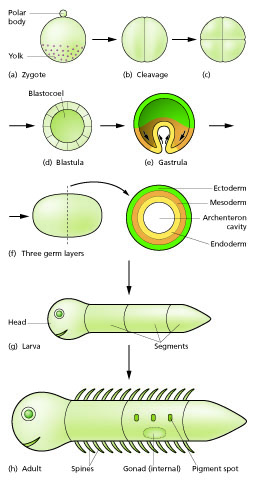
Diagram of stages of embryo development to a larval and adult stage.

In developmental biology, animal embryonic development, also known as animal embryogenesis, is the developmental stage of an animal embryo. Embryonic development starts with the fertilization of an egg cell (ovum) by a sperm cell (spermatozoon). Once fertilized, the ovum becomes a single diploid cell known as a zygote. The zygote undergoes mitotic divisions with no significant growth (a process known as cleavage) and cellular differentiation, leading to development of a multicellular embryo after passing through an organizational checkpoint during mid-embryogenesis. In mammals, the term refers chiefly to the early stages of prenatal development, whereas the terms fetus and fetal development describe later stages.

The main stages of animal embryonic development are as follows:

- The zygote undergoes a series of cell divisions (called cleavage) to form a structure called a morula.
- The morula develops into a structure called a blastula through a process called blastulation.
- The blastula develops into a structure called a gastrula through a process called gastrulation.
- The gastrula then undergoes further development, including the formation of organs (organogenesis).

The embryo then transforms into the next stage of development, the nature of which varies among different animal species (examples of possible next stages include a fetus and a larva).

== Fertilization and the zygote ==
The egg cell is generally asymmetric, having an animal pole (future ectoderm). It is covered with protective envelopes, with different layers. The first envelope – the one in contact with the membrane of the egg – is made of glycoproteins and is known as the vitelline membrane (zona pellucida in mammals). Different taxa show different cellular and acellular envelopes englobing the vitelline membrane.

Fertilization is the fusion of gametes to produce a new organism. In animals, the process involves a sperm fusing with an ovum, which eventually leads to the development of an embryo. Depending on the animal species, the process can occur within the body of the female in internal fertilization, or outside in the case of external fertilization. The fertilized egg cell is known as the zygote.

To prevent more than one sperm fertilizing the egg (polyspermy), fast block and slow block to polyspermy are used. Fast block, the membrane potential rapidly depolarizing and then returning to normal, happens immediately after an egg is fertilized by a single sperm. Slow block begins in the first few seconds after fertilization and is when the release of calcium causes the cortical reaction, in which various enzymes are released from cortical granules in the eggs plasma membrane, causing the expansion and hardening of the outside membrane, preventing more sperm from entering.

== Cleavage and morula ==
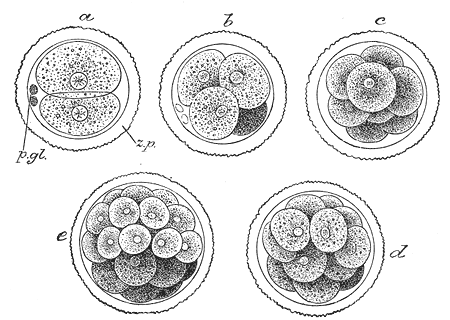
Cell divisions (cleavage)

Cell division (via mitosis) with no significant growth, producing a cluster of cells that is the same size as the original zygote, is called cleavage. At least four initial cell divisions occur, resulting in a dense ball of at least sixteen cells called the morula. In the early mouse embryo, the sister cells of each division remain connected during interphase by microtubule bridges. The different cells derived from cleavage, up to the blastula stage, are called blastomeres.

Depending mostly on the amount of yolk in the egg, the cleavage can be holoblastic (total) or meroblastic (partial). Holoblastic cleavage occurs in animals with little yolk in their eggs, such as humans and other mammals who receive nourishment as embryos from the mother, via the placenta or milk, such as might be secreted from a marsupium. Meroblastic cleavage occurs in animals whose eggs have more yolk (i.e. birds and reptiles). Because cleavage is impeded in the vegetal pole, there is an uneven distribution and size of cells, being more numerous and smaller at the animal pole of the zygote. In holoblastic eggs, the first cleavage always occurs along the vegetal-animal axis of the egg, and the second cleavage is perpendicular to the first. From here the spatial arrangement of blastomeres can follow various patterns, due to different planes of cleavage, in various organisms:

Cleavage patterns followed by holoblastic and meroblastic eggs in animals
Holoblastic	Meroblastic
Radial (sea urchin, amphioxus); Bilateral (tunicates, amphibians); Spiral (annelids, mollusks); Rotational (placental mammals, marsupials, nematodes)	Discoidal (fish, monotremes, birds, reptiles); Superficial (insects)

=== Holoblastic ===
Holoblastic cleavage is cleavage of all the cells derived from the original zygote. The division furrow crosses the entire cell cluster; the whole cell cluster eventually becomes the embryo. (In meroblastic cleavage some cells will become the yolk sac.) Different types of animal differ in the geometry of the division furrow: cleavage is radial, spiral, bilateral or rotational.

Animals that belong to the basal phyla have holoblastic radial cleavage which results in radial symmetry (see: Symmetry in biology). During cleavage, there is a central axis that all divisions rotate about. The basal phyla also have only one to two embryonic cell layers, compared to the three in bilateral animals.

=== Meroblastic ===
Meroblastic cleavage is the division of some but not all cells, as the division furrow does not protrude into the yolky region. The cells there impede formation of the associated membrane and only the other cells separate. Meroblastic cleavage is bilateral, discoidal or centrolecithal.

=== Morula ===
In amniotes, the cells of the morula are at first closely aggregated, but soon they become arranged into an outer or peripheral layer, the trophoblast, which does not contribute to the formation of the embryo proper, and an inner cell mass, from which the embryo is developed. Fluid collects between the trophoblast and the greater part of the inner cell-mass, and thus the morula is converted into a vesicle, called the blastodermic vesicle. The inner cell mass remains in contact, however, with the trophoblast at one pole of the ovum; this is named the embryonic pole, since it indicates the location where the future embryo will develop.

== Formation of the blastula ==
The end of cleavage is known as midblastula transition and coincides with the onset of zygotic transcription.

After the seventh cleavage has produced 128 cells, the morula becomes a blastula. The blastula is usually a spherical layer of cells (the blastoderm) surrounding a fluid-filled or yolk-filled cavity the blastocoel. The blastula is a single sheet of cells; in most phyla it then undergoes gastrulation. The resulting gastrula has in some species two, in most three, cell layers.

Mammals at this stage form a structure called the blastocyst, characterized by an inner cell mass that is distinct from the surrounding blastula. The blastocyst is similar in structure to the blastula but their cells have different fates. In the mouse, primordial germ cells arise from the inner cell mass (the epiblast) as a result of extensive genome-wide reprogramming. Reprogramming involves global DNA demethylation facilitated by the DNA base excision repair pathway as well as chromatin reorganization, and results in cellular totipotency.

Before gastrulation, the cells of the trophoblast become differentiated into two layers: The outer layer forms a syncytium (i.e., a layer of protoplasm studded with nuclei, but showing no evidence of subdivision into cells), termed the syncytiotrophoblast, while the inner layer, the cytotrophoblast, consists of well-defined cells. As already stated, the cells of the trophoblast do not contribute to the formation of the embryo proper; they form the ectoderm of the chorion and play an important part in the development of the placenta. On the deep surface of the inner cell mass, a layer of flattened cells, called the endoderm, is differentiated and quickly assumes the form of a small sac, called the yolk sac. Spaces appear between the remaining cells of the mass and, by the enlargement and coalescence of these spaces, a cavity called the amniotic cavity is gradually developed. The floor of this cavity is formed by the embryonic disk, which is composed of a layer of prismatic cells – the embryonic ectoderm, derived from the inner cell mass and lying in apposition with the endoderm.

=== Formation of the germ layers ===
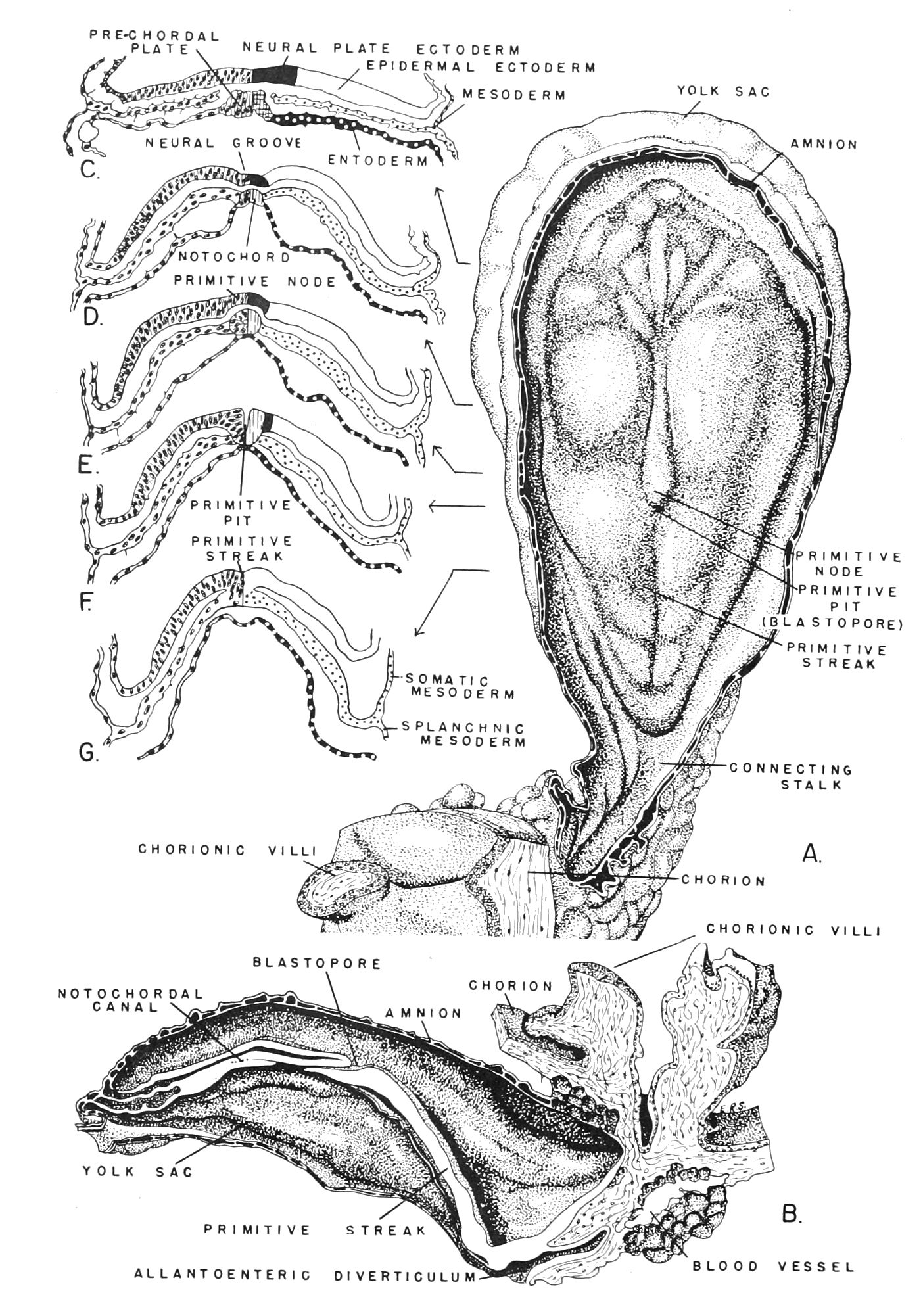
Comparative vertebrate embryology.

The embryonic disc becomes oval and then pear-shaped, the wider end being directed forward. Towards the narrow, posterior end, an opaque area, the primitive streak, is formed and extends along the middle of the disc for about half of its length; at the anterior end of the streak there is a knob-like thickening termed the primitive node or knot (known as Hensen's knot in birds).

A shallow groove, the primitive groove, appears on the surface of the streak, and the anterior end of this groove communicates by means of an aperture, the blastopore, with the yolk sac. The primitive streak is produced by a thickening of the axial part of the ectoderm, the cells of which multiply, grow downward, and blend with those of the subjacent endoderm. From the sides of the primitive streak a third layer of cells, the mesoderm, extends laterally between the ectoderm and endoderm; the caudal end of the primitive streak forms the cloacal membrane. The blastoderm now consists of three layers, an outer ectoderm, a middle mesoderm, and an inner endoderm; each has distinctive characteristics and gives rise to certain tissues of the body:

- The innermost layer, or endoderm, gives rise to the digestive organs, the gills, lungs or swim bladder if present, and kidneys or nephrites.
- The middle layer, or mesoderm, gives rise to the muscles, skeleton if any, and blood system.
- The outer layer of cells, or ectoderm, gives rise to the nervous system, including the brain, and skin or carapace, and hair, bristles or scales.

For many mammals, it is sometime during formation of the germ layers that implantation of the embryo in the uterus of the mother occurs.

== Formation of the gastrula ==
During gastrulation cells migrate to the interior of the blastula, subsequently forming two (in diploblastic animals) or three (triploblastic) germ layers. The embryo during this process is called a gastrula. The germ layers are referred to as the ectoderm, mesoderm and endoderm. In diploblastic animals only the ectoderm and the endoderm are present.* Among different animals, different combinations of the following processes occur to place the cells in the interior of the embryo:

  - Epiboly – expansion of one cell sheet over other cells
  - Ingression – migration of individual cells into the embryo (cells move with pseudopods)
  - Invagination – infolding of cell sheet into embryo, forming the mouth, anus, and archenteron.
  - Delamination – splitting or migration of one sheet into two sheets
  - Involution – inturning of cell sheet over the basal surface of an outer layer
  - Polar proliferation – Cells at the polar ends of the blastula/gastrula proliferate, mostly at the animal pole.
- Other major changes during gastrulation:
  - Heavy RNA transcription using embryonic genes; up to this point the RNAs used were maternal (stored in the unfertilized egg).
  - Cells start major differentiation processes, losing their totipotentiality.

In most animals, a blastopore is formed at the point where cells are migrating inward. Two major groups of animals can be distinguished according to the blastopore's fate. In deuterostomes the anus forms from the blastopore, while in protostomes it develops into the mouth.

=== Formation of the early nervous system – neural groove, tube and notochord ===
In front of the primitive streak, two longitudinal ridges, caused by a folding up of the ectoderm, make their appearance, one on either side of the middle line formed by the streak. These are named the neural folds; they commence some little distance behind the anterior end of the embryonic disk, where they are continuous with each other, and from there gradually extend backward, one on either side of the anterior end of the primitive streak. Between these folds is a shallow median groove, the neural groove. The groove gradually deepens as the neural folds become elevated, and ultimately the folds meet and coalesce in the middle line and convert the groove into a closed tube, the neural tube or canal, the ectodermal wall of which forms the rudiment of the nervous system. After the coalescence of the neural folds over the anterior end of the primitive streak, the blastopore no longer opens on the surface but into the closed canal of the neural tube, and thus a transitory communication, the neurenteric canal, is established between the neural tube and the primitive digestive tube. The coalescence of the neural folds occurs first in the region of the hind brain, and from there extends forward and backward; toward the end of the third week, the front opening (anterior neuropore) of the tube finally closes at the anterior end of the future brain, and forms a recess that is in contact, for a time, with the overlying ectoderm; the hinder part of the neural groove presents for a time a rhomboidal shape, and to this expanded portion the term sinus rhomboidalis has been applied. Before the neural groove is closed, a ridge of ectodermal cells appears along the prominent margin of each neural fold; this is termed the neural crest or ganglion ridge, and from it the spinal and cranial nerve ganglia and the ganglia of the sympathetic nervous system are developed. By the upward growth of the mesoderm, the neural tube is ultimately separated from the overlying ectoderm.

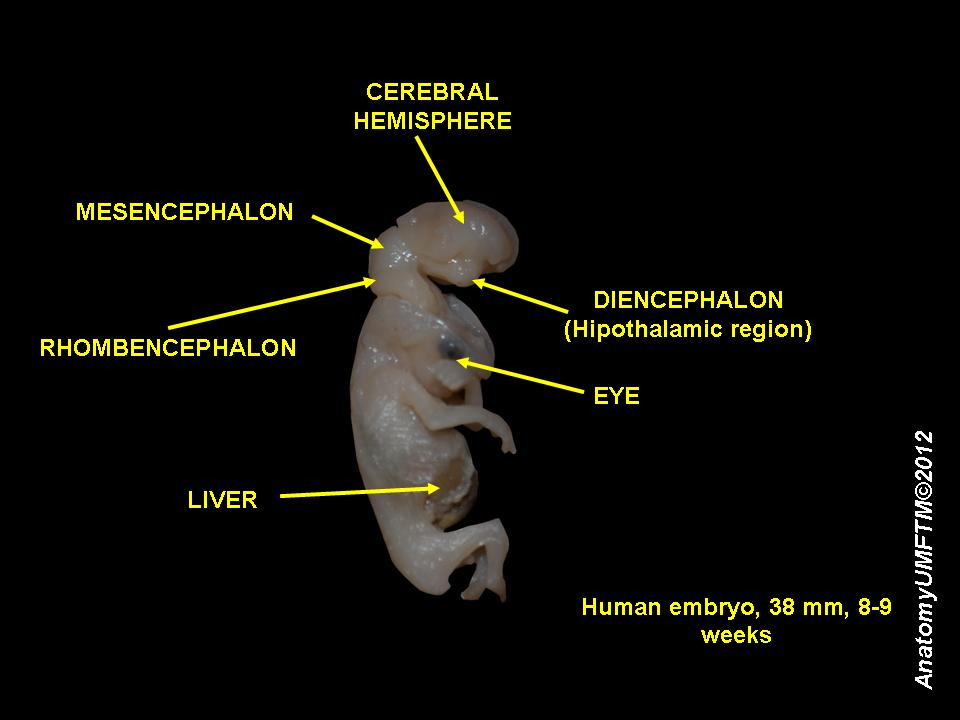
Dissection of human embryo

The cephalic end of the neural groove exhibits several dilatations that, when the tube is closed, assume the form of the three primary brain vesicles, and correspond, respectively, to the future forebrain (prosencephalon), midbrain (mesencephalon), and hindbrain (rhombencephalon) (Fig. 18). The walls of the vesicles are developed into the nervous tissue and neuroglia of the brain, and their cavities are modified to form its ventricles. The remainder of the tube forms the spinal cord (medulla spinalis); from its ectodermal wall the nervous and neuroglial elements of the spinal cord are developed, while the cavity persists as the central canal.

=== Formation of the early septum ===
The extension of the mesoderm takes place throughout the whole of the embryonic and extra-embryonic areas of the ovum, except in certain regions. One of these is seen immediately in front of the neural tube. Here the mesoderm extends forward in the form of two crescentic masses, which meet in the middle line so as to enclose behind them an area that is devoid of mesoderm. Over this area, the ectoderm and endoderm come into direct contact with each other and constitute a thin membrane, the buccopharyngeal membrane, which forms a septum between the primitive mouth and pharynx.

=== Early formation of the heart and other primitive structures ===
In front of the buccopharyngeal area, where the lateral crescents of mesoderm fuse in the middle line, the pericardium is afterward developed, and this region is therefore designated the pericardial area. A second region where the mesoderm is absent, at least for a time, is that immediately in front of the pericardial area. This is termed the proamniotic area, and is the region where the proamnion is developed; in humans, however, it appears that a proamnion is never formed. A third region is at the hind end of the embryo, where the ectoderm and endoderm come into apposition and form the cloacal membrane.

== Somitogenesis ==
Sample 3D cell of somitogenesis

Somitogenesis is the process by which somites (primitive segments) are produced. These segmented tissue blocks differentiate into skeletal muscle, vertebrae, and dermis of all vertebrates.

Somitogenesis begins with the formation of somitomeres (whorls of concentric mesoderm) marking the future somites in the presomitic mesoderm (unsegmented paraxial). The presomitic mesoderm gives rise to successive pairs of somites, identical in appearance that differentiate into the same cell types but the structures formed by the cells vary depending upon the anteroposterior (e.g., the thoracic vertebrae have ribs, the lumbar vertebrae do not). Somites have unique positional values along this axis and it is thought that these are specified by the Hox homeotic genes.

Toward the end of the second week after fertilization, transverse segmentation of the paraxial mesoderm begins, and it is converted into a series of well-defined, more or less cubical masses, also known as the somites, which occupy the entire length of the trunk on either side of the middle line from the occipital region of the head. Each segment contains a central cavity (known as a [myocoel), which, however, is soon filled with angular and spindle-shape cells. The somites lie immediately under the ectoderm on the lateral aspect of the neural tube and notochord, and are connected to the lateral mesoderm by the intermediate cell mass. Those of the trunk may be arranged in the following groups, viz.: cervical 8, thoracic 12, lumbar 5, sacral 5, and coccygeal from 5 to 8. Those of the occipital region of the head are usually described as being four in number. In mammals, somites of the head can be recognized only in the occipital region, but a study of the lower vertebrates leads to the belief that they are present also in the anterior part of the head and that, altogether, nine segments are represented in the cephalic region.

== Organogenesis ==
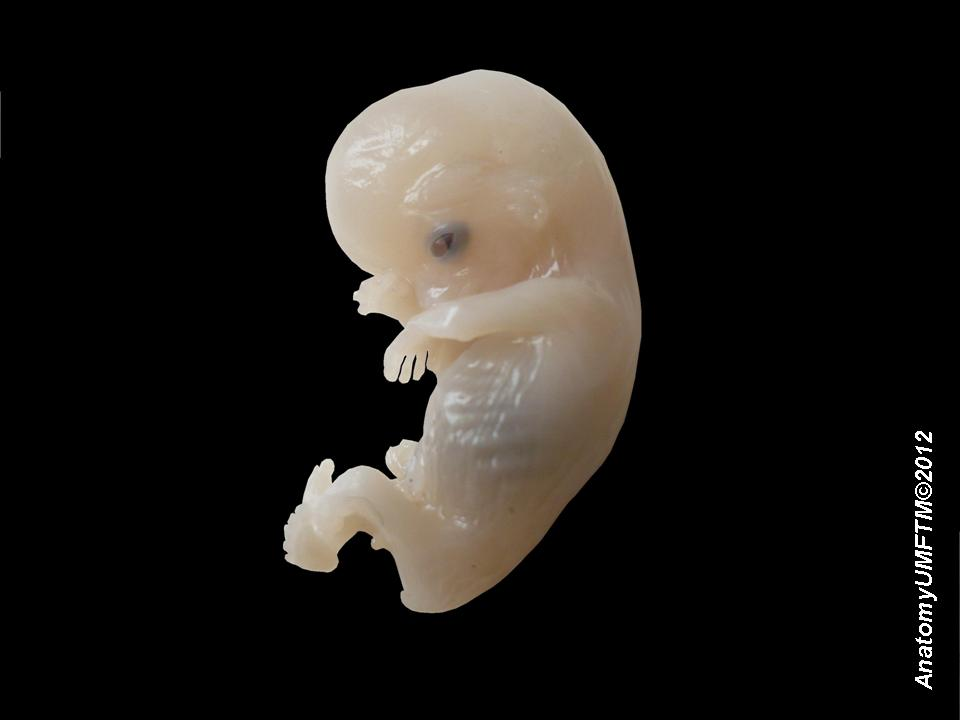
Human embryo, 8–9 weeks, 38 mm (1.5 in)

At some point after the different germ layers are defined, organogenesis begins. The first stage in vertebrates is called neurulation, where the neural plate folds forming the neural tube (see above). Other common organs or structures that arise at this time include the heart and somites (also above), but from now on embryogenesis follows no common pattern among the different taxa of the animalia.

In most animals organogenesis, along with morphogenesis, results in a larva. The hatching of the larva, which must then undergo metamorphosis, marks the end of embryonic development.

== See also ==
- Cdx2 gene
- Collective cell migration
- Drosophila embryogenesis
- Enterocoely
- Homeobox genes
- Human embryogenesis
- Leech embryogenesis
- Parthenogenesis
- Plant embryogenesis
- Schizocoely
- Shell-less chick embryo culture
