= Neuroectoderm =

Ectoderm that goes on to form the neural plate

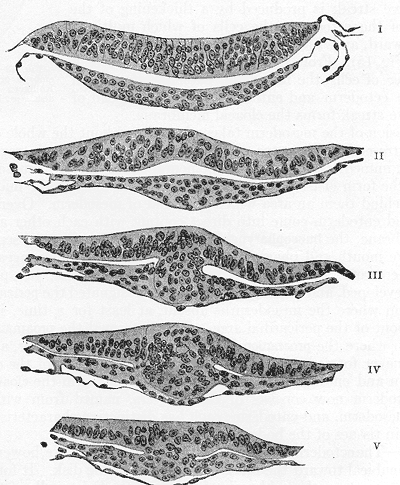

Details
- Precursor: Ectoderm
- Gives rise to: Neural tube, neural crest

Identifiers
- Latin: epithelium tubi neuralis, neuroectoderma, epithelium tubae neuralis
- TE: E5.15.1.0.0.0.1

Neuroectoderm (or neural ectoderm or neural tube epithelium) consists of cells derived from the ectoderm. Formation of the neuroectoderm is the first step in the development of the nervous system. The neuroectoderm receives bone morphogenetic protein-inhibiting signals from proteins such as noggin, which leads to the development of the nervous system from this tissue. Histologically, these cells are classified as pseudostratified columnar cells.

After recruitment from the ectoderm, the neuroectoderm undergoes three stages of development: transformation into the neural plate, transformation into the neural groove (with associated neural folds), and transformation into the neural tube. After formation of the tube, the brain forms into three sections; the hindbrain, the midbrain, and the forebrain.

The types of neuroectoderm include:

- Neural crest
  - pigment cells in the skin
  - ganglia of the autonomic nervous system
  - dorsal root ganglia.
  - facial cartilage
  - aorticopulmonary septum of the developing heart and lungs
  - ciliary body of the eye
  - adrenal medulla
- Neural tube
  - brain (rhombencephalon, mesencephalon and prosencephalon)
  - spinal cord and motor neurons
  - retina
  - posterior pituitary

== See also ==
- Neural plate
- Neuroectodermal neoplasm
- Neuroepithelial cell
