= NTN5 =

Protein-coding gene in the species Homo sapiens

Identifiers
- Aliases: NTN5, netrin 5
- External IDs: MGI: 2685330; GeneCards: NTN5
Available structures
PDB	Ortholog search: PDBe RCSB
PDB	List of PDB id codes 4URT

Gene location (Human)
Chr.	Chromosome 19 (human)
Band	19q13.33	Start	48,661,407 bp
Band	19q13.33	End	48,673,081 bp

Gene location (Mouse)
Chr.	Chromosome 7 (mouse)
Band	7|7 B3	Start	45,333,446 bp
Band	7|7 B3	End	45,343,980 bp
RNA expression pattern
Bgee	Human / Mouse (ortholog); Top expressed in: right uterine tube; pituitary gland; anterior pituitary; left ovary; right ovary; cerebellar hemisphere; right hemisphere of cerebellum; left uterine tube; granulocyte; canal of the cervix / Top expressed in: gastrula; dentate gyrus of hippocampal formation granule cell; primary visual cortex; seminiferous tubule; superior frontal gyrus; cervix; embryo; hippocampus proper; stria vascularis; nerve; More reference expression data
BioGPS	n/a
Orthologs
Databases	NCBI: entry; OMA: entry
Species	Human	Mouse
Entrez	126147	243967
Ensembl	ENSG00000142233	ENSMUSG00000070564
UniProt	Q8WTR8	Q3UQ22
RefSeq (mRNA)	NM_145807	NM_001033356; NM_001289692; NM_001289693; NM_001358870
RefSeq (protein)	NP_665806	NP_001028528; NP_001276621; NP_001276622; NP_001345799
Location (UCSC)	Chr 19: 48.66 – 48.67 Mb	Chr 7: 45.33 – 45.34 Mb
PubMed search
- Wikidata
View/Edit Human	View/Edit Mouse

Netrin-5 (NTN5), also known as netrin-1-like protein, is a protein that in humans is encoded by the NTN5 gene. Netrin-5 is included in the family of secreted laminin-related proteins.

== Function ==
Netrin-5 functions are not fully clarified. However, it is believed to:

- Plays an important role in neurogenesis by controlling the development of dendrites and acting as a guide for axons.
- Regulates cell migration in the brain during embryonic development.
- Prevents motor neuron cell body migration out of the neural tube.

== Clinical significance ==
A recent genome-wide association study (GWAS) has found that genetic variations in HAVCR2 are associated with late-onset sporadic Alzheimer's disease (LOAD). However, it's unknown how netrin-5 mutation contributes to disease.

Considering the role of NTN5 in cell migration, it is very possible that netrin-5 has an important role in human carcinogenesis, although currently no tumor type with NTN5 alterations has been identified.
