= Leech embryogenesis =

Leech embryogenesis is the process by which the embryo of the leech forms and develops. The embryonic development of the larva occurs as a series of stages. During stage 1, the first cleavage occurs, which gives rise to an AB and a CD blastomere, and is in the interphase of this cell division when a yolk-free cytoplasm called teloplasm is formed. The teloplasm is known to be a determinant for the specification of the D cell fate. In stage 3, during the second cleavage, an unequal division occurs in the CD blastomere. As a consequence, it creates a large D cell on the left and a smaller C cell to the right. This unequal division process is dependent on actomyosin, and by the end of stage 3 the AB cell divides. On stage 4 of development, the micromeres and teloblast stem cells are formed and subsequently, the D quadrant divides to form the DM and the DNOPQ teloblast precursor cells. By the end stage 6, the zygote contains a set of 25 micromeres, 3 macromeres (A, B and C) and 10 teloblasts derived from the D quadrant.

The teloblasts are pairs of five different types (M, N, O, P, and Q) of embryonic stem cells that form segmented columns of cells (germinal band) in the surface of the embryo. The M-derived cells make mesoderm and some small set of neurons, N results in neural tissues and some ventral ectoderm, Q contributes to the dorsal ectoderm and O and P in the leech are equipotent cells (same developmental potential) that produce lateral ectoderm; however the difference between the two of them is that P creates bigger batches of dorsolateral epidermis than O. The sludgeworm Tubifex, unlike the leech, specifies the O and P lineages early in development and therefore, these two cells are not equipotent. Each segment of the body of the leech is generated from one M, O, P cell types and two N and two Q cells types.

The ectoderm and mesoderm of the body trunk are exclusively derived from the teloblast cells in a region called the posterior progress zone. The head of the leech that comes from an unsegmented region, is formed by the first set of micromeres derived from A, B, C and D cells, keeping the bilateral symmetry between the AD and BC cells.
