= Neural fold =

Structure arising during embryonic development of birds and mammals

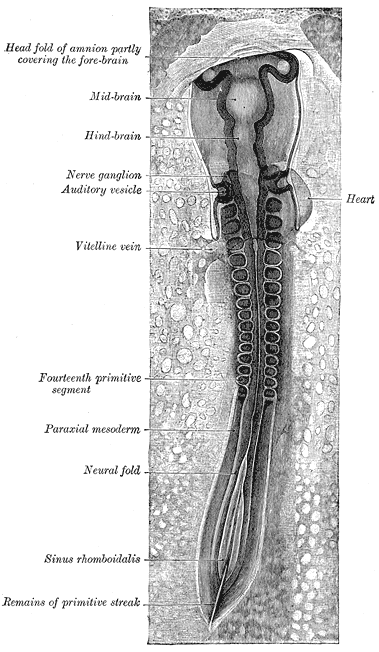
- Chick embryo of thirty-three hours’ incubation, viewed from the dorsal aspect. 30x. (Neural fold labeled at center left, third from the bottom.)

Details
- Carnegie stage: 9
- Precursor: Neural plate
- Gives rise to: Neural tube

Identifiers
- Latin: plica neuralis
- TE: fold_by_E5.13.1.0.1.0.2 E5.13.1.0.1.0.2

The neural fold is a structure that arises during neurulation in the embryonic development of both birds and mammals among other organisms. This structure is associated with primary neurulation, meaning that it forms by the coming together of tissue layers, rather than a clustering, and subsequent hollowing out, of individual cells (known as secondary neurulation). In humans, the neural folds are responsible for the formation of the anterior end of the neural tube. The neural folds are derived from the neural plate, a preliminary structure consisting of elongated ectoderm cells. The folds give rise to neural crest cells, as well as bringing about the formation of the neural tube.

== Development ==
In the embryo, the formation of the neural folds originates from the area where the neural plate and the surrounding ectoderm converge. This region of the embryo is formed after gastrulation, and consists of epithelial tissue. Here, the epithelial cells elongate by means of microtubule polymerization, increasing their height. The thumbnail below shows this process, as well as the subsequent formation of the neural crest cells and the neural tube, which arise from the joining of the neural folds.

=== Folding ===
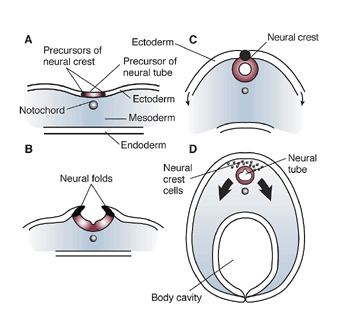
A strip of specialized cells called the notochord (A) induces the cells of the ectoderm directly above it to become the primitive nervous system (i.e., neuroepithelium). The neuroepithelium then folds over (B). As the tips of the folds fuse together, a hollow tube (the neural tube) forms (C)—the precursor of the brain and spinal cord. Meanwhile, the ectoderm and endoderm continue to curve around and fuse to create the body cavity, completing the transformation of the embryo from a flattened disk to a three–dimensional body. Cells originating from the fused tips of the neuroectoderm (neural crest cells) migrate to various locations throughout the embryo, where they will initiate the development of diverse body structures (D).

The formation of the neural fold is initiated by the release of calcium from within the cells. The released calcium interacts with proteins that can modify the actin filaments in the outer epithelial tissue, or ectoderm, in order to induce the dynamic cell movements necessary to create the fold. These cells are held together by cadherins (specifically E and N-cadherin), types of intercellular binding protein. When the cells at the peaks of the neural folds come in proximity with each other, it is the affinity for similar cadherin molecules (N-cadherins) that allows these cells to bind to each other. Thus, when the neural tube precursor cells begin expressing N-cadherin in the place of E-cadherin, this causes the neural tube to form and separate from the ectoderm and settle inside the embryo. When the cells fail to associate in a manner that is not part of the normal course of development, severe diseases can occur.

=== Process overview ===
The process of folding begins when the cells in the central region of the neural plate, the medial hinge point cells, bind to the notochord beneath them. This creates a central anchoring point for the process of folding to occur, and subsequently creates the neural groove. As the neural folds continue to extend, dorsolateral hinge points form, allowing the folds to curve into a tube-like structure. When the peaks of the folds (known as the neural crest regions) touch, they merge and involute, creating the neural tube beneath the newly formed epidermal layer.

=== Mechanism ===
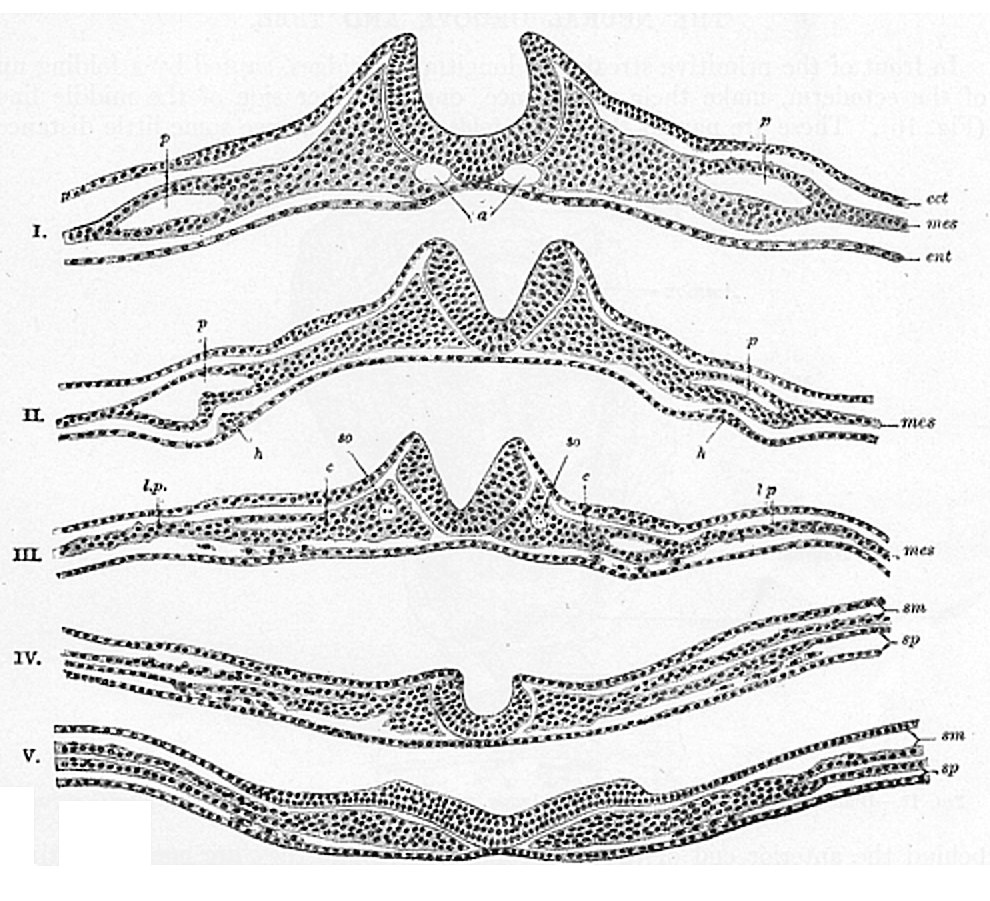
Cross section through the embryonic disc showing the fold.

The molecular mechanism behind this process lies in the expression and repression of bone morphogenetic proteins (BMPs). BMPs are a wide family of proteins that perform many functions throughout the growing embryo, including stimulating the growth of cartilage and bone. In order to allow for the growth of precursor neural tissues, as opposed to precursor bone or cartilage tissues, BMP expression is decreased in the neural plate, specifically along the medial line, where the neural groove will soon form. The proteins produced from the genes Noggin and Chordin inhibit these BMPs, and subsequently allow neural commitment genes, like SOX, to be expressed. These genes encode transcription factors, which alter the genomic expression of these cells, furthering them along the path of neural cell commitment. This process of BMP inhibition allows for the anchoring of the medial hinge point cells, providing the neural folds with the foundation necessary for folding and closure to occur. Noggin and Chordin have other roles in the neurulation process, including stimulating the neural crest cells to emigrate from the newly formed neural tube. The Sonic hedgehog gene also plays a role in attenuating BMP expression, forming the medial hinge point while inhibiting the formation of the dorsolateral hinge points, and in ensuring the proper closure of the neural folds. The prechordal plate, notochord, and non-neural ectoderm are believed to be important inducer tissues that release these chemical signals, in order to trigger neural plate folding.

The final adhesion of the converging neural folds is due to several different types of intercellular binding proteins. Cadherins and their CAM receptor molecules, for example, are present in two types in the neural precursor tissue: E-cadherin keeps the cells of the neural plate and surrounding ectoderm adhered to each other, while N-cadherin does the same for the cells of the neural fold. Only cells expressing the same kind of cadherin can bind to each other; since the peaks of the neural folds both express N-cadherin, they are able to merge into a continuous sheet of cells. Likewise, it is this diminished affinity between cells expressing different types of cadherin that allows the neural tube precursor cells to separate from the ectoderm, forming the neural tube on the interior of the embryo and the true epidermis on the exterior. Another set of molecules involved with the merging of the neural folds are the ephrin molecules and their Eph receptors, which adhere in a similar manner to the cadherin molecules discussed above.

== Derivative structures ==
The merging of the neural folds gives rise to many structures including the neural tube (the precursor to the central nervous system), neural crest cells(which give rise to a variety of diverse mesenchymal cells), and to the true epidermal layer. The neural fold is an extremely important structure in that this mechanism is needed to produce these diverse kinds of cells in the right places.

== Clinical significance ==
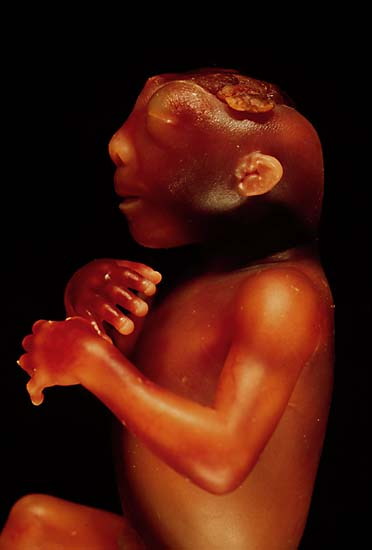
A side view of an anencephalic fetus

There are many potential diseases that can arise from the improper adhesion or merging of the neural folds. During folding, the openings that are formed at the cranial and caudal regions are termed the cranial and caudal neuropores. If the caudal neuropore fails to close, a condition called spina bifida can occur, in which the bottom of the spinal cord remains exposed. Often this condition can be detected during prenatal examinations and be treated before birth, though in more severe cases the individual may cope with the condition for the rest of his or her life. Depending on the severity and the affected area, individuals can experience a variety of symptoms, including a varying motor function and mobility, bladder control, and/or sexual function.

If the failure is instead in the cranial neuropore, anencephaly occurs. In this condition, the brain tissue is directly exposed to the amniotic fluid, and is subsequently degraded. If the entire neural tube fails to close, the condition is referred to as craniorachischisis.

== See also ==
- Developmental biology
- Neurulation
