= Neurulation =

Embryological process forming the neural tube

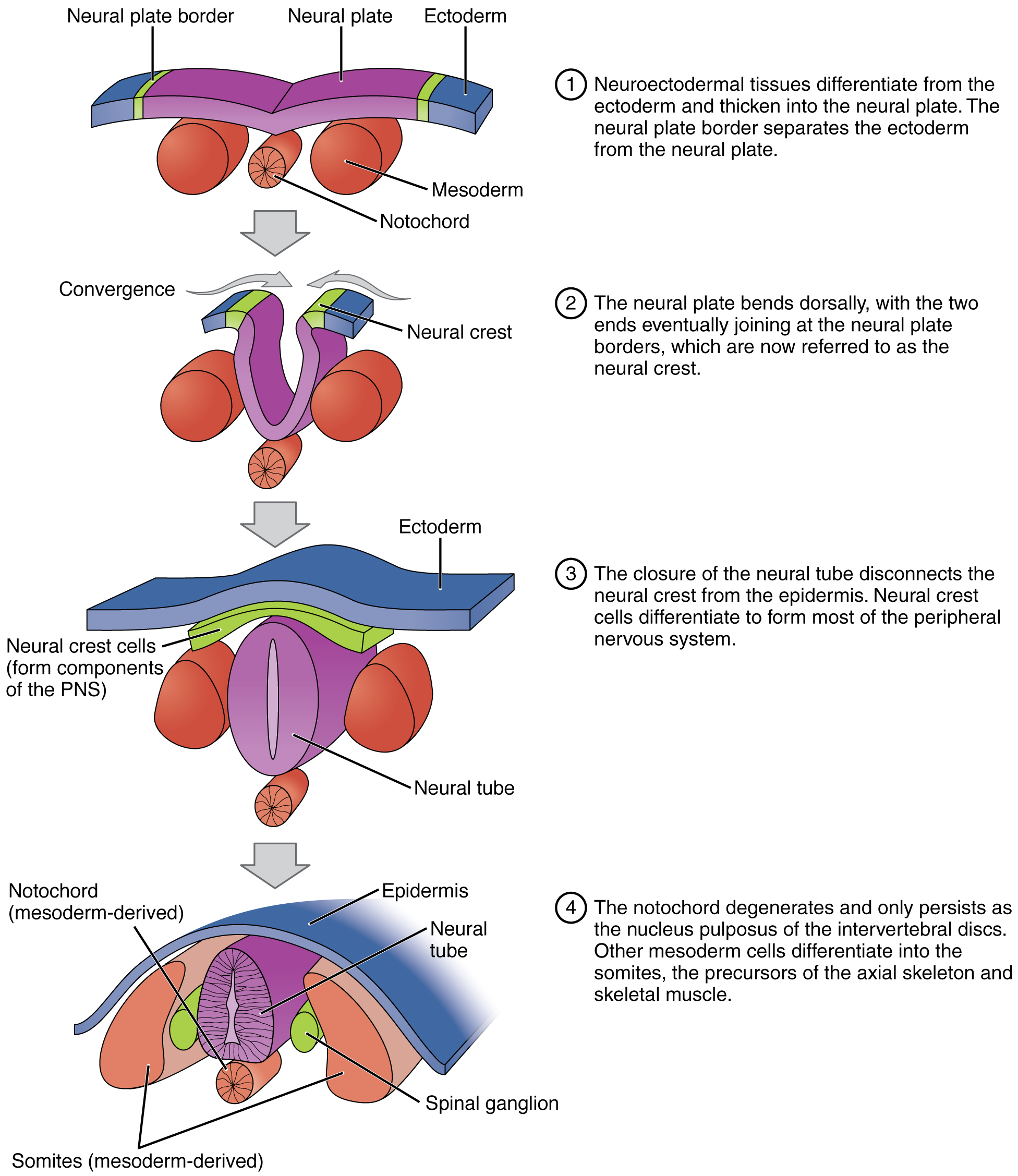
- Transverse sections that show the progression of the neural plate to the neural groove from bottom to top

Identifiers
- MeSH: D054261

Neurulation refers to the folding process in vertebrate embryos, which includes the transformation of the neural plate into the neural tube. The embryo at this stage is termed the neurula.

The process begins when the notochord induces the formation of the central nervous system (CNS) by signaling the ectoderm germ layer above it to form the thick and flat neural plate. The neural plate folds in upon itself to form the neural tube, which will later differentiate into the spinal cord and the brain, eventually forming the central nervous system. Computer simulations found that cell wedging and differential proliferation are sufficient for mammalian neurulation.

Different portions of the neural tube form by two different processes, called primary and secondary neurulation, in different species.

- In primary neurulation, the neural plate creases inward until the edges come in contact and fuse.
- In secondary neurulation, the tube forms by hollowing out of the interior of a solid precursor.

== Primary neurulation ==
Cross section of a vertebrate embryo in the neurula stage

A description of the neurulation process in three dimensions.

=== Primary neural induction ===
The concept of induction originated in work by Pandor in 1817. The first experiments proving induction were attributed by Viktor Hamburger to independent discoveries of both Hans Spemann of Germany in 1901 and Warren Lewis of the USA in 1904. It was Hans Spemann who first popularized the term "primary neural induction" in reference to the first differentiation of ectoderm into neural tissue during neurulation. It was called "primary" because it was thought to be the first induction event in embryogenesis. The Nobel prize-winning experiment was done by his student Hilda Mangold. Ectoderm from the region of the dorsal lip of the blastopore of a developing salamander embryo was transplanted into another embryo and this "organizer" tissue "induced" the formation of a full secondary axis changing surrounding tissue in the original embryo from ectodermal to neural tissue. The tissue from the donor embryo was therefore referred to as the inducer because it induced the change. While the organizer is the dorsal lip of the blastopore, this is not one set of cells, but rather is a constantly changing group of cells that migrate over the dorsal lip of the blastopore by forming apically constricted bottle cells. At any given time during gastrulation there will be different cells that make up the organizer.

Subsequent work on inducers by scientists over the 20th century demonstrated that not only could the dorsal lip of the blastopore act as an inducer but so could a huge number of other seemingly unrelated items. This began when boiled ectoderm was found to still be able to induce by Johannes Holtfreter. Items as diverse as low pH, cyclic AMP, even floor dust could act as inducers leading to considerable consternation. Even tissue which could not induce when living could induce when boiled. Other items such as lard, wax, banana peels and coagulated frog's blood did not induce. The hunt for a chemically based inducer molecule was taken up by developmental molecular biologists and a vast literature of items shown to have inducer abilities continued to grow.

More recently, the inducer molecule has been attributed to genes, and in 1995, there was a call for all the genes involved in primary neural induction and all their interactions to be catalogued, in an effort to determine "the molecular nature of Spemann's organizer". Several other proteins and growth factors have also been invoked as inducers, including soluble growth factors such as bone morphogenetic protein and a requirement for "inhibitory signals" such as noggin and follistatin.

Even before the term induction was popularized, several authors, beginning with Hans Driesch in 1894, suggested that primary neural induction might be mechanical in nature. A mechanochemical-based model for primary neural induction was proposed in 1985 by G.W. Brodland and R. Gordon. An actual physical wave of contraction has been shown to originate from the precise location of the Spemann organizer which then traverses the presumptive neural epithelium and a full working model of how primary neural inductions was proposed in 2006. There has long been a general reluctance in the field to consider the possibility that primary neural induction might be initiated by mechanical effects. A full explanation for primary neural induction remains yet to be found.

=== Shape change ===
As neurulation proceeds after induction, the cells of the neural plate become high-columnar and can be identified through microscopy as different from the surrounding presumptive epithelial ectoderm (epiblastic endoderm in amniotes). The cells move laterally and away from the central axis and change into a truncated pyramid shape. This pyramid shape is achieved through tubulin and actin in the apical portion of the cell which constricts as they move. The variation in cell shapes is partially determined by the location of the nucleus within the cell, causing bulging in areas of the cells forcing the height and shape of the cell to change. This process is known as apical constriction. The result is a flattening of the differentiating neural plate which is particularly obvious in salamanders when the previously round gastrula becomes a rounded ball with a flat top. See Neural plate.

=== Folding ===
The process of the flat neural plate folding into the cylindrical neural tube is termed primary neurulation. As a result of the cellular shape changes, the neural plate forms the medial hinge point (MHP). The expanding epidermis puts pressure on the MHP and causes the neural plate to fold resulting in neural folds and the creation of the neural groove. The neural folds form dorsolateral hinge points (DLHP) and pressure on this hinge cause the neural folds to meet and fuse at the midline. The fusion requires the regulation of cell adhesion molecules. The neural plate switches from E-cadherin expression to N-cadherin and N-CAM expression to recognize each other as the same tissue and close the tube. This change in expression stops the binding of the neural tube to the epidermis.

The notochord plays an integral role in the development of the neural tube. Prior to neurulation, during the migration of epiblastic endoderm cells towards the hypoblastic endoderm, the notochordal process opens into an arch termed the notochordal plate and attaches overlying neuroepithelium of the neural plate. The notochordal plate then serves as an anchor for the neural plate and pushes the two edges of the plate upwards while keeping the middle section anchored. Some of the notochordal cells become incorporated into the center section neural plate to later form the floor plate of the neural tube. The notochord plate separates and forms the solid notochord.

The folding of the neural tube to form an actual tube does not occur all at once. Instead, it begins approximately at the level of the fourth somite at Carnegie stage 9 (around embryonic day 20 in humans). The lateral edges of the neural plate touch in the midline and join together. This continues both cranially (toward the head) and caudally (toward the tail). The openings that are formed at the cranial and caudal regions are termed the cranial and caudal neuropores. In human embryos, the cranial neuropore closes approximately on day 24 and the caudal neuropore on day 28. Failure of the cranial (superior) and caudal (inferior) neuropore closure results in conditions called anencephaly and spina bifida, respectively. Additionally, failure of the neural tube to close throughout the length of the body results in a condition called rachischisis.

=== Patterning ===
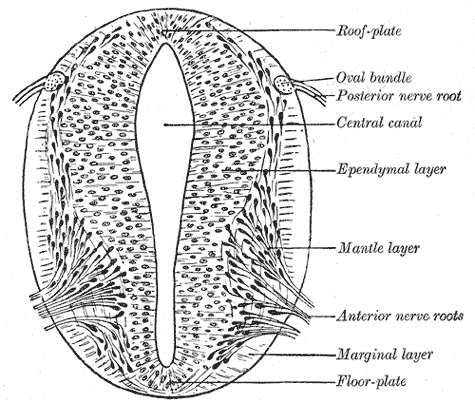
Transverse section of the neural tube showing the floor plate and roof plate

According to the French Flag model where stages of development are directed by gene product gradients, several genes are considered important for inducing patterns in the open neural plate, especially for the development of neurogenic placodes. These placodes first become evident histologically in the open neural plate. After sonic hedgehog (SHH) signalling from the notochord induces its formation, the floor plate of the incipient neural tube also secretes SHH. After closure, the neural tube forms a basal or floor plate and a roof or alar plate in response to the combined effects of SHH and factors including BMP4 secreted by the roof plate. The basal plate forms most of the ventral portion of the nervous system, including the motor portion of the spinal cord and brain stem; the alar plate forms the dorsal portions, devoted mostly to sensory processing.

The dorsal epidermis expresses BMP4 and BMP7. The roof plate of the neural tube responds to those signals by expressing more BMP4 and other transforming growth factor beta (TGF-β) signals to form a dorsal/ventral gradient among the neural tube. The notochord expresses SHH. The floor plate responds to SHH by producing its own SHH and forming a gradient. These gradients allow for the differential expression of transcription factors.

=== Complexities of the model ===
Neural tube closure is not entirely understood. Closure of the neural tube varies by species. In mammals, closure occurs by meeting at multiple points which then close up and down. In birds, neural tube closure begins at one point of the midbrain and moves anteriorly and posteriorly.

== Secondary neurulation ==
Primary neurulation develops into secondary neurulation when the caudal neuropore undergoes final closure. The cavity of the spinal cord extends into the neural cord. In secondary neurulation, the neural ectoderm and some cells from the endoderm form the medullary cord. The medullary cord condenses, separates and then forms cavities. These cavities then merge to form a single tube. Secondary neurulation occurs in the posterior section of most animals but it is better expressed in birds. Tubes from both primary and secondary neurulation eventually connect at around the sixth week of development.

In humans, the mechanisms of secondary neurulation plays an important role given its impact on the proper formation of the human posterior spinal cord. Errors at any point in the process can yield problems. For example, retained medullary cord occurs due to a partial or complete arrest of secondary neurulation that creates a non-functional portion on the vestigial end.

== Early brain development ==
The anterior portion of the neural tube forms the three main parts of the brain: the forebrain (prosencephalon), midbrain (mesencephalon), and the hindbrain (rhombencephalon). These structures initially appear just after neural tube closure as bulges called brain vesicles in a pattern specified by anterior-posterior patterning genes, including Hox genes, other transcription factors such as Emx, Otx, and Pax genes, and secreted signaling factors such as fibroblast growth factors (FGFs) and Wnts. These brain vesicles further divide into subregions. The prosencephalon gives rise to the telencephalon and diencephalon, and the rhombencephalon generates the metencephalon and myelencephalon. The hindbrain, which is the evolutionarily most ancient part of the chordate brain, also divides into different segments called rhombomeres. The rhombomeres generate many of the most essential neural circuits needed for life, including those that control respiration and heart rate, and produce most of the cranial nerves. Neural crest cells form ganglia above each rhombomere. The early neural tube is primarily composed of the germinal neuroepithelium, later called the ventricular zone, which contains primary neural stem cells called radial glial cells and serves as the main source of neurons produced during brain development through the process of neurogenesis.

== Non-neural ectoderm tissue ==
Paraxial mesoderm surrounding the notochord at the sides will develop into the somites (future muscles, bones, and contributes to the formation of limbs of the vertebrate).

== Neural crest cells ==
Masses of tissue called the neural crest that are located at the very edges of the lateral plates of the folding neural tube separate from the neural tube and migrate to become a variety of different but important cells.

Neural crest cells will migrate through the embryo and will give rise to several cell populations, including pigment cells and the cells of the peripheral nervous system.

== Neural tube defects ==
Failure of neurulation, especially failure of closure of the neural tube are among the most common and disabling birth defects in humans, occurring in roughly 1 in every 500 live births. Failure of the rostral end of the neural tube to close results in anencephaly, or lack of brain development, and is most often fatal. Failure of the caudal end of the neural tube to close causes a condition known as spina bifida, in which the spinal cord fails to close.

== See also ==
- Embryonic differentiation waves
- Neural fold
- Neural plate
- Neural crest
