= Neuroepithelial cell =

Cells forming the neural tube wall during embryogenesis

Neuroepithelial cells, or neuroectodermal cells, form the wall of the closed neural tube in early embryonic development. The neuroepithelial cells span the thickness of the tube's wall, connecting with the pial surface and with the ventricular or lumenal surface. They are joined at the lumen of the tube by junctional complexes, where they form a pseudostratified layer of epithelium called neuroepithelium.

Neuroepithelial cells are the stem cells of the central nervous system, known as neural stem cells, and generate the intermediate progenitor cells known as radial glial cells, that differentiate into neurons and glia in the process of neurogenesis.

== Embryonic neural development ==
=== Brain development ===
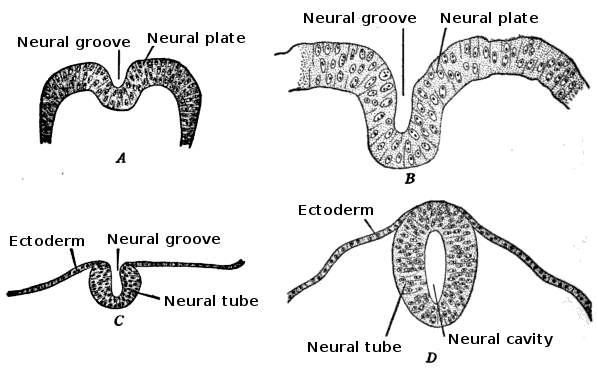
Development of the neural tube

During the third week of embryonic growth, the brain begins to develop in the early fetus in a process called morphogenesis. Neuroepithelial cells of the ectoderm begin multiplying rapidly and fold in forming the neural plate, which invaginates during the fourth week of embryonic growth and forms the neural tube. The formation of the neural tube polarizes the neuroepithelial cells by orienting the apical side of the cell to face inward, which later becomes the ventricular zone, and the basal side is oriented outward, which contacts the pia, or outer surface of the developing brain. As part of this polarity, neuroepithelial cells express prominin-1 in the apical plasma membrane as well as tight junctions to maintain the cell polarity. Integrin alpha 6 anchors the neuroepithelial cells to the basal lamina. The neural tube begins as a single layer of pseudostratified epithelial cells, but rapid proliferation of neuroepithelial cells creates additional layers and eventually three distinct regions of growth. As these additional layers form the apical-basal polarity must be downregulated. Further proliferation of the cells in these regions gives rise to three distinct areas of the brain: the forebrain, midbrain, and hindbrain. The neural tube also gives rise to the spinal cord.

=== Neuroepithelial cell proliferation ===
Neuroepithelial cells symmetrically divide or differentiate into progenitor cells called radial glial cells in asymmetric cell division. These can further differentiate into neurons or glial cells.

Neuroepithelial cells are a class of stem cell and have the ability to self-renew. During the formation of the neural tube, neuroepithelial cells undergo symmetric proliferative divisions that give rise to two new neuroepithelial cells. At a later stage of brain development, neuroepithelial cells begin to self renew and give rise to non-stem cell progenitors, such as radial glial cells simultaneously by undergoing asymmetric division. Expression of Tis21, an antiproliferative gene, causes the neuroepithelial cell to make the switch from proliferative division to neuronic division. Many of the neuroepithelial cells also divide into radial glial cells, a similar, but more fate restricted cell. Being a more fate restricted cell the radial glial cell will either generate postmitotic neurons, intermediate progenitor cells, or astrocytes in gliogenesis. During neuroepithelial cell division, interkinetic nuclear migration allows the cells to divide unrestricted while maintaining a dense packing. During G1 the cell nucleus migrates to the basal side of the cell and remains there for S phase and migrates to the apical side for G2 phase. This migration requires the help of microtubules and actin filaments.

=== Radial glial cell transition ===
Neuroepithelial cells give rise to radial glial progenitor cells in early embryonic development. To make this change, neuroepithelial cells begin to downregulate their epithelial features, by stopping the expression of occludin, a tight junction protein. Loss of occludin causes a loss of the previous tight junction seals which is required for the generation of neuroblasts. Another tight junction protein, PARD3, remains at the apical side of the cell co-localizing with N-cadherin and keeps the apical face of the neuroepithelial cell intact. In the absence of occludin some polarity is still lost and the neuroepithelial cell gives rise to the radial glial cell.

== Adult neurogenesis ==
=== Genesis of neuroepithelial cells in the adult CNS ===
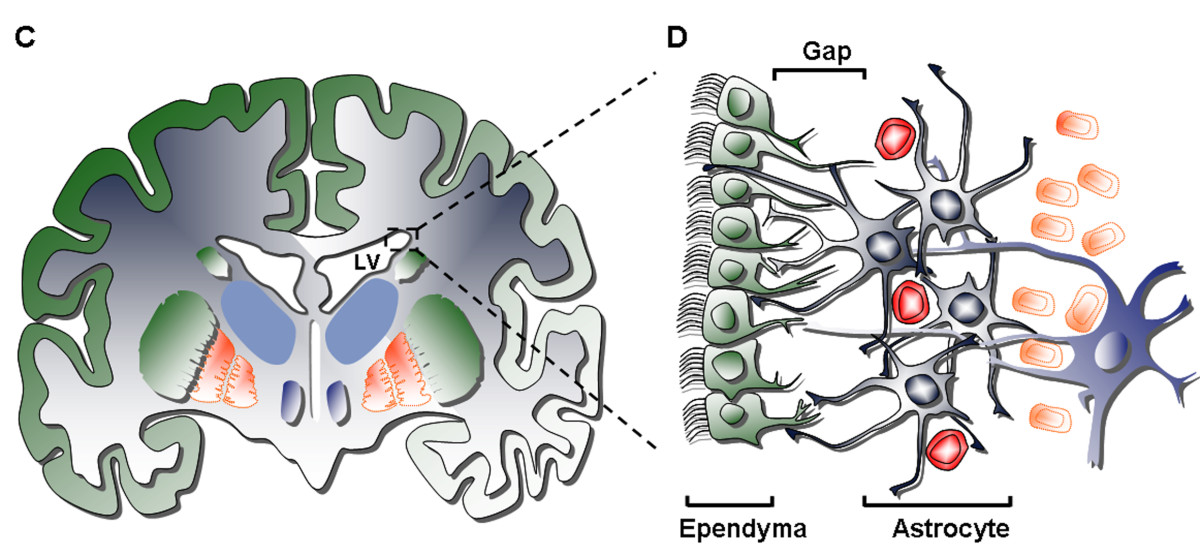
Moving away from the ependymal layer of the SVZ the neural cells become more and more differentiated

In the adult CNS, neuroepithelial cells arise in several different areas of the brain: the subventricular zone (SVZ), the olfactory bulb and the dentate gyrus of the hippocampus. These cells do not appear in any of the peripheral nervous system. Often categorized as neural stem cells, neuroepithelial cells give rise to only a few varieties of neural cells, making them multipotent - a definite distinction from the pluripotent stem cells found in embryonic development. Neuroepithelial cells undergo mitosis generating more neuroepithelial cells, radial glial cells or progenitor cells, the latter two differentiating into either neurons or glial cells. The neuroepithelial cells undergo two different forms of mitosis: asymmetric differentiating division and symmetric prolific division. The asymmetric cell division results in two different varieties of daughter cells (i.e. a neuroepithelial cell divides into a radial glial cell and another neuroepithelial cell), while the symmetric version yields identical daughter cells. This effect is caused by the orientation of the mitotic spindle, which is located in either the posterior or anterior area of the mitotic cell, rather than the center where it is found during symmetric division. The progenitor cells and radial glial cells respond to extracellular trophic factors - like ciliary neurotrophic factor (CNTF), cytokines or neuregulin 1 (NRG1) - that can determine whether the cells will differentiate into either neurons or glia. On a whole, neurogenesis is regulated both by many varied regulatory pathways in the CNS as well as several other factors, from genes to external stimuli such as the individual behavior of a person. The large interconnected web of regulatory responses acts to fine-tune the responses provided by newly formed neurons.

=== Neurogenesis in neural repair ===
Neurogenesis in the adult brain is often associated with diseases that deteriorate the CNS, like Huntington's disease, Alzheimer's disease, and Parkinson's disease. While adult neurogenesis is up-regulated in the hippocampus in patients with these diseases, whether its effects are regenerative or inconclusive remains to be seen. Individuals with these diseases also often express diminished olfactory abilities as well as decreased cognitive activity in the hippocampus, areas specific to neurogenesis. The genes associated with these diseases like α-synuclein, presenilin 1, MAPT (microtubule associated protein tau) and huntingtin are also often associated with plasticity in the brain and its modification. Neuroplasticity is associated with neurogenesis in a complementary fashion. The new neurons generated by the neuroepithelial cells, progenitors and radial glial cells will not survive unless they are able to integrate into the system by making connections with new neighbors. This also leads to many controversial concepts, like neurogenic therapy involving the transplant of local progenitor cells to a damaged area.

== Associated diseases ==
=== Dysembryoplastic neuroepithelial tumor (DNT) ===
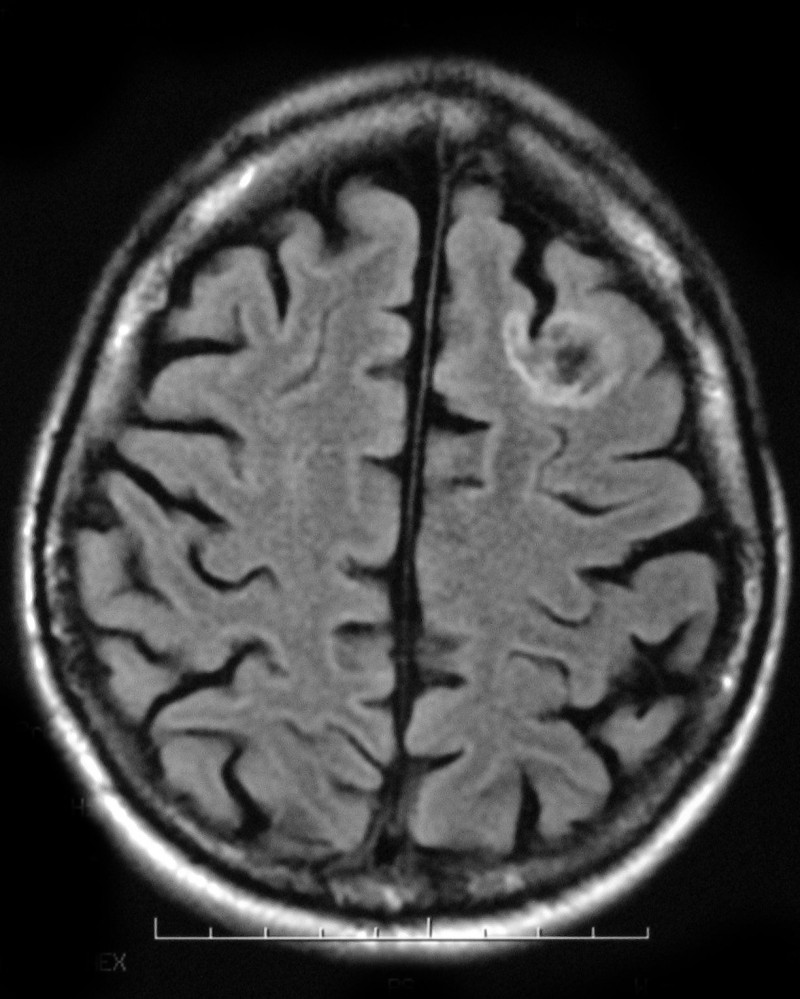
Dysembryoplastic neuroepithelial tumor

A dysembryoplastic neuroepithelial tumor is a rare, benign tumor that affects children and teenagers under the age of twenty. The tumor occurs in the tissue covering the brain and spinal cord. The symptoms of the tumor are dependent on its location, but most children experience seizures that cannot be controlled by medication. DNT is usually treated through invasive surgery and the patients are usually capable of recovering fully, with little to no long-term effects.

=== Neuroepithelial cysts ===
Neuroepithelial cysts, also known as colloid cysts, develop in individuals between the ages of 20 and 50 and is relatively rare in individuals under the age of twenty. The cysts are benign tumors that usually appear in the anterior third ventricle. The cysts occur in the epithelium putting their patients at risk for obstructive hydrocephalus, increased intracranial pressure, and rarely intracystic hemorrhage. This results from the cysts enlarging by causing the epithelium to secrete additional mucinous fluid. The cysts are usually found incidentally or if patients become symptomatic presenting with the symptoms of hydrocephalus. The larger cysts are operated on while smaller cysts that are not obstructive can be left alone.

=== Oligodendroglial tumors ===
Oligodendroglial tumors manifest in glial cells, which are responsible for supporting and protecting nerve cells in the brain. The tumor develops over oligodendrocytes and is usually found in the cerebrum around the frontal or temporal lobes. The tumors can either grow slowly in a well-differentiated manner delaying the onset of symptoms, or they can grow rapidly to form an anaplastic oligodendroglioma. The symptoms for this type of tumor include headaches and visual problems. Additionally, blockage of ventricles could cause buildup of cerebral spinal fluid resulting in swelling around the tumor. The location of the tumor may also affect the symptoms since frontal lobe tumors can cause gradual mood or personality changes while temporal lobe tumors result in coordination and speech problems.

== Ongoing research ==
=== Neural chimeras ===
Researchers have been able to create neural chimeras by combining neurons that developed from embryonic stem cells with glial cells that were also derived from embryonic stem cells. These neural chimeras give researchers a comprehensive way of studying the molecular mechanisms behind cell repair and regeneration via neuroepithelial precursor cells and will hopefully shed light on possible nervous system repair in a clinical setting. In an attempt to identify the key features that differentiate neuroepithelial cells from their progenitor cells, researchers identified an intermediate filament that was expressed by 98% of the neuroepithelial cells of the neural tube, but none of their progenitor cells. After this discovery it became clear that all three cell types in the nervous system resulted from a homogenous population of stem cells. In order make clinical neural repair possible researchers needed to further characterize regional determination of stem cells during brain development by determining what factors commit a precursor to becoming one or the other. While the exact factors that lead to differentiation are unknown, researchers have taken advantage of human-rat neural chimeras to explore the development of human neurons and glial cells in an animal model. These neural chimeras have permitted researchers to look at neurological diseases in an animal model where traumatic and reactive changes can be controlled. Eventually researchers hope to be able to use the information taken from these neural chimera experiments to repair regions of the brain affected by central nervous system disorders. The problem of delivery, however, has still not been resolved as neural chimeras have been shown to circulate throughout the ventricles and incorporate into all parts of the CNS. By finding environmental cues of differentiation, neuroepithelial precursor transplantation could be used in the treatment of many diseases including multiple sclerosis, Huntington's disease, and Parkinson's disease. Further exploration of neural chimera cells and chimeric brains will provide evidence for manipulating the correct genes and increasing the efficacy of neural transplant repair.

=== Depression ===
Research on depression indicates that one of the major causal factors of depression, stress, also influences neurogenesis. This connection led researches to postulate that depression could be the result of changes in levels of neurogenesis in the adult brain, specifically in the dentate gyrus. Studies indicate that stress affects neurogenesis by increasing Glucocorticoids and decreasing neurotransmitters such as serotonin. These effects were further verified by inducing stress in lab animals, which resulted in decreased levels of neurogenesis. Additionally, modern therapies that treat depression also promote neurogenesis. Ongoing research is looking to further verify this connection and define the mechanism by which it occurs. This could potentially lead to a better understanding of the development of depression as well as future methods of treatment.

== See also ==
- List of human cell types derived from the germ layers
