= Neurenteric canal =

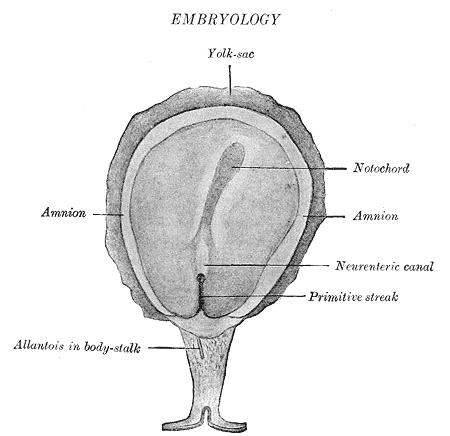
- Surface view of embryo of Hylobates concolor.

Details
- Carnegie stage: 6
- Days: 15

The neurenteric canal is also known as the canal of Kovalevsky. In the development of vertebrate animals, during the 6th Carnegie stage, the proximal part of the notochordal canal persists temporarily as the neurenteric canal, which forms a transitory communication between the amniotic sac and the yolk sac cavities. The neurenteric canal is thought to play a role in the maintenance and adjustment of pressure between the amniotic sac and the yolk sac. When the development of the notochord is complete, the neurenteric canal normally closes.

A failure of neurenteric canal closure may result in spinal or cranial neurenteric cysts, a pathological finding which may cause symptoms if their location or size cause compression of brain or spine structures.
