= Carnegie stages =

System describing embryonic development

In embryology, Carnegie stages are a standardized system of 23 stages used to provide a unified developmental chronology of the vertebrate embryo.

The stages are delineated through the development of structures, not by size or the number of days of development, and so the chronology can vary between species, and to a certain extent between embryos. In the human being, only the first 60 days of development are covered; at that point, the term embryo is usually replaced with the term fetus.

It was based on work by Streeter (1942) and O'Rahilly and Müller (1987). The name "Carnegie stages" comes from the Carnegie Institution of Washington.

While the Carnegie stages provide a universal system for staging and comparing the embryonic development of most vertebrates, other systems are occasionally used for the common model organisms in developmental biology, such as the Hamburger–Hamilton stages in the chick.

== Stages ==
Days are approximate and reflect the days since the last ovulation before pregnancy ("Postovulatory age").

=== Stage 1: 1 days ===
- fertilization
- polar bodies

Carnegie stage 1 is the unicellular embryo. This stage is divided into three substages.

==== Stage 1 a ====
Primordial embryo. All the genetic material necessary for a new individual, along with some redundant chromosomes, are present within a single plasmalemma. Penetration of the fertilising sperm allows the oocyte to resume meiosis and the polar body is extruded.

==== Stage 1 b ====
Pronuclear embryo. Two separate haploid components are present - the maternal and paternal pronuclei. The pronuclei move towards each other and eventually compress their envelopes where they lie adjacent near the centre of the wall.

==== Stage 1 c ====
Syngamic embryo. The last phase of fertilisation. The pronuclear envelopes disappear and the parental chromosomes come together in a process called syngamy.

=== Stage 2: 2-3 days ===
- cleavage
- morula
- compaction

Carnegie stage 2 (CS2) begins when the zygote undergoes its first cell division, and ends when the blastocyst forms a cavity and comprises more than 16 cells. At this point, it is called a morula.

The cleavage divisions of CS2 embryos do not occur synchronously. And the fate of the blastomeres is not yet determined.

The two-cell embryo is spherical and surrounded by the transparent zona pellucida. Each of the blastomeres that form is also spherical.

On approximately day 3, at the eight-cell stage, compaction usually begins.

=== Stage 3: 4-5 days ===
- blastocyst and blastocoele
- trophoblast and embryoblast

Carnegie stage 3 begins when a cavity first appears in the morula and ends after the hatching from the zona pellucida when the embryo makes contact with the endometrial lining of the uterus.

There are only two stage 3 embryos in the Carnegie collection.

There are four characteristic processes that CS3 embryos go through cavitation, collapse and expansion, hatching, and discarding of cells.

==== Cavitation ====
The initiation of cavitation indicates the start of CS3. This process leads to the differentiation of blastocysts into outer trophoblast cells and inner embryoblasts.

==== Collapse and expansion ====
This process is seen in vitro and it is not known whether this occurs in vivo. In vitro, the blastocyst rapidly collapses and slowly re-expands before hatching from the zona pellucida.

==== Hatching ====
During this process, the blastocyst breaks through and escapes from the zona pellucida. This process must occur prior to implantation into the endometrium.

==== Discarding of cells ====
TEM inspection of in vitro blastocysts has allowed us to identify two types of cells that the developing embryo apparently discards. These are sequestered cells and isolated cells. Sequestered cells are groups of cells that are located in between the zona pellucida and the trophoblast. Isolated cells are mainly found in the blastocystic cavity.

=== Stage 4: 6 days ===
- syncytiotrophoblast
- cytotrophoblast
- amniotic ectoderm

=== Stage 5 (a-c): 7-12 days ===
- implantation
- bilaminar embryonic disc
- primary yolk sac
- amniotic cavity

=== Stage 6: c. 17 days ===
- primitive streak
- primitive groove
- chorionic villi
- secondary yolk sac
- early gastrulation

=== Stage 7: c. 19 days ===
- gastrulation
- neural plate
- start of hematopoiesis
- notochord

=== Stage 8: c. 23 days ===
- primitive pit

=== Stage 9: c. 25 days ===
- neural groove
- neural folds
- septum transversum
- placode
- early heart

=== Stage 10: c. 28 days ===
- pharyngeal arches #1 and #2
- cardiac loop
- intermediate mesoderm

=== Stage 11: c. 29 days ===
- sinus venosus
- mesonephric duct

=== Stage 12: c. 30 days ===
- upper limb buds

=== Stage 13: c. 32 days ===
- septum primum
- foramen primum

=== Stage 14: c. 33 days ===
- ureteric bud

=== Stage 15: c. 36 days ===
Development of the Olfactory nerve and the early stage foot and hand plates

=== Stage 16: c. 39 days ===
- lower limb buds

=== Stage 17: c. 41 days ===
- implementation embryo in posterior uterus wall

=== Stage 18: c. 44 days ===
- septum secundum

=== Stage 19: c. 46 days ===
Ectoderm: sensory placodes, lens pit, otocyst, nasal pits moved ventrally, fourth ventricle of brain Mesoderm: heart prominence, ossification continues Head: forebrain, eye, external acoustic meatus Body: straightening of trunk, heart, liver, umbilical cord

=== Stage 20: c. 49 days ===
Ectoderm: sensory placodes, lens pit, otocyst, nasal pits moved ventrally, fourth ventricle of brain

Mesoderm: heart prominence, ossification continues

Head: forebrain, eye, external acoustic meatus hearing - otic capsule connected with the basal plate and with the future exoccipitals. Tip of the cochlea is elongated and curled. Tensor tympani and stapedius present.

=== Stage 21: c. 51days ===
Ectoderm: sensory placodes, nasal pits moved ventrally, fourth ventricle of brain Mesoderm: heart prominence, ossification continues

Head: nose, eye, external acoustic meatus

Body: straightening of trunk, heart, liver, umbilical cord

Limb: upper limbs longer and bent at elbow, foot plate with digital rays begin to separate, wrist, hand plate with webbed digits

=== Stage 22: c. 53 days ===
Mesoderm: heart prominence, ossification continues

Head: nose, eye, external acoustic meatus

Body: straightening of trunk, heart, liver, umbilical cord

Limb: upper limbs longer and bent at elbow, foot plate with webbed digits, wrist, hand plate with separated digits

=== Stage 23: c. 56 days ===
Final embryonic stage, after this development is described as "fetal" through the entire second and third trimester.

Mesoderm: ossification continues

Head: eyelids, external ears, rounded head

Body: straightening of trunk, intestines herniated at umbilicus

Limbs: hands and feet turned inward

== See also ==
- Mammalian embryogenesis
