= Neural tube =

Developmental precursor to the central nervous system

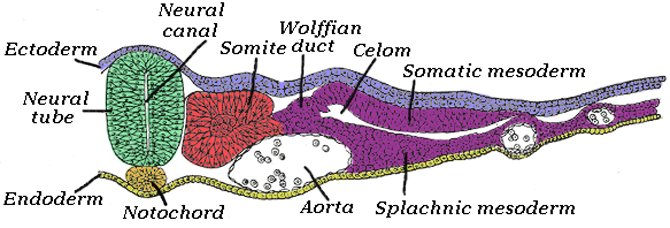
- Transverse section of half of a chick embryo of forty-five hours' incubation. The dorsal (back) surface of the embryo is toward the top of this page, while the ventral (front) surface is toward the bottom. (Neural tube is in green.)

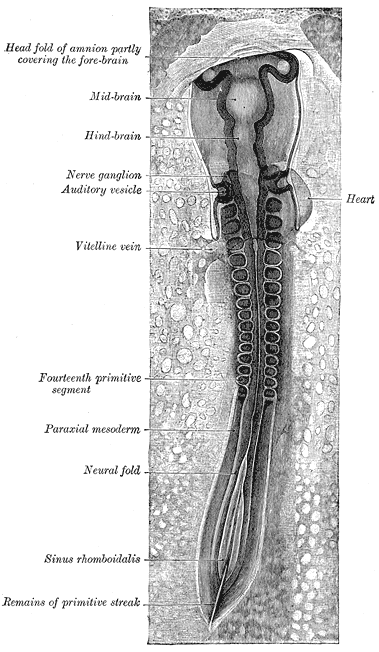
- Chick embryo of thirty-three hours' incubation, viewed from the dorsal aspect (30x magnification)

Details
- Carnegie stage: 10
- Precursor: Neural groove
- Gives rise to: Central nervous system (brain and spinal cord)

Identifiers
- Latin: tubus neuralis, tuba neuralis
- MeSH: D054259
- TE: tube_by_E5.14.1.0.0.0.1 E5.14.1.0.0.0.1

In the developing chordate (including vertebrates), the neural tube is the embryonic precursor to the central nervous system, which is made up of the brain and spinal cord. The neural groove gradually deepens as the neural folds become elevated, and ultimately the folds meet and coalesce in the middle line and convert the groove into the closed neural tube. In humans, neural tube closure usually occurs by the fourth week of pregnancy (the 28th day after conception).

Stages of neural tube formation.

== Development ==
The neural tube develops in two ways: primary neurulation and secondary neurulation.

Primary neurulation divides the ectoderm into three cell types:

- The internally located neural tube
- The externally located epidermis
- The neural crest cells, which develop in the region between the neural tube and epidermis but then migrate to new locations
1. Primary neurulation begins after the neural plate forms. The edges of the neural plate start to thicken and lift upward, forming the neural folds. The center of the neural plate remains grounded, allowing a U-shaped neural groove to form. This neural groove sets the boundary between the right and left sides of the embryo. The neural folds pinch in towards the midline of the embryo and fuse together to form the neural tube.
2. In secondary neurulation, the cells of the neural plate form a cord-like structure that migrates inside the embryo and hollows to form the tube.

Each organism uses primary and secondary neurulation to varying degrees.

- Neurulation in fish proceeds only via the secondary form.
- In avian species, the posterior regions of the tube develop using secondary neurulation and the anterior regions develop by primary neurulation.
- In mammals, secondary neurulation begins around the 35th somite.

Mammalian neural tubes close in the head in the opposite order that they close in the trunk.

- In the head:

1. Neural crest cells migrate
2. Neural tube closes
3. Overlying ectoderm closes

- In the trunk:

1. Overlying ectoderm closes
2. Neural tube closes
3. Neural crest cells migrate

== Structure ==
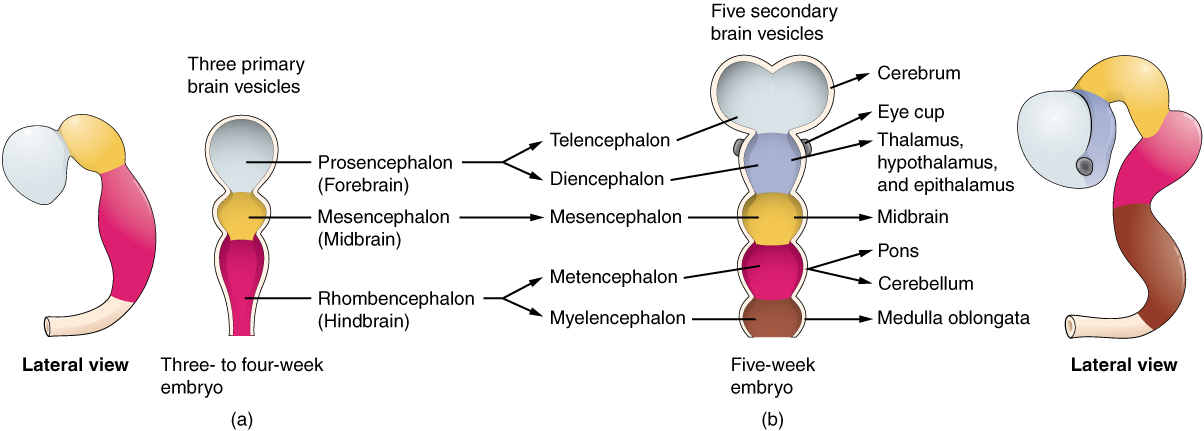
Stages of development of the brain vesicles

Four neural tube subdivisions each eventually develop into distinct regions of the central nervous system by the division of neuroepithelial cells: the forebrain (prosencephalon), the midbrain (mesencephalon), the hindbrain (rhombencephalon) and the spinal cord.

- The prosencephalon further goes on to develop into the telencephalon (cerebrum) and the diencephalon (the optic vesicles and hypothalamus).
- The mesencephalon stays as the midbrain.
- The rhombencephalon develops into the metencephalon (the pons and cerebellum) and the myelencephalon (the medulla oblongata).

For a short time, the neural tube is open both cranially and caudally. These openings, called neuropores, close during the fourth week in humans. Improper closure of the neuropores can result in neural tube defects such as anencephaly or spina bifida.

The dorsal part of the neural tube contains the alar plate, which is associated primarily with sensation. The ventral part of the neural tube contains the basal plate, which is primarily associated with motor (i.e., muscle) control.

The spinal cord develops from the posterior neural tube. As the spinal cord develops, the cells making up the wall of the neural tube proliferate and differentiate into the neurons and glia of the spinal cord. The dorsal tissues will be associated with sensory functions, and the ventral tissues will be associated with motor functions.

== Dorsal-ventral patterning ==
The neural tube patterns along the dorsal-ventral axis to establish defined compartments of neural progenitor cells that lead to distinct classes of neurons. According to the French flag model of morphogenesis, this patterning occurs early in development and results from the activity of several secreted signaling molecules. Sonic hedgehog (Shh) is a key player in patterning the ventral axis, while bone morphogenic proteins (BMPs) and Wnt family members play an important role in patterning the dorsal axis. Other factors shown to provide positional information to the neural progenitor cells include fibroblast growth factors (FGFs) and retinoic acid. Retinoic acid is required ventrally along with Shh to induce Pax6 and Olig2 during differentiation of motor neurons.

Three main ventral cell types are established during early neural tube development: the floor plate cells, which form at the ventral midline during the neural fold stage; as well as the more dorsally located motor neurons and interneurons. These cell types are specified by the secretion of the Shh from the notochord (located ventrally to the neural tube), and later from the floor plate cells. Shh acts as a morphogen, meaning that it acts in a concentration-dependent manner to specify cell types as it moves further from its source.

The following is a proposed mechanism for how Shh patterns the ventral neural tube: A gradient of Shh that controls the expression of a group of homeodomain (HD) and basic Helix-Loop-Helix (bHLH) transcription factors is created. These transcription factors are grouped into two protein classes based on how Shh affects them. Class I is inhibited by Shh, whereas Class II is activated by Shh. These two classes of proteins then cross-regulate each other to create more defined boundaries of expression. The different combinations of expression of these transcription factors along the dorsal-ventral axis of the neural tube are responsible for creating the identity of the neuronal progenitor cells. Five molecularly distinct groups of ventral neurons form from these neuronal progenitor cells in vitro. Also, the position at which these neuronal groups are generated in vivo can be predicted by the concentration of Shh required for their induction in vitro. Studies have shown that neural progenitors can evoke different responses based on the length of exposure to Shh, with a longer exposure time resulting in more ventral cell types.

At the dorsal end of the neural tube, BMPs are responsible for neuronal patterning. BMP is initially secreted from the overlying ectoderm. A secondary signaling center is then established in the roof plate, the dorsal most structure of the neural tube. BMP from the dorsal end of the neural tube seems to act in the same concentration-dependent manner as Shh in the ventral end. This was shown using zebrafish mutants that had varying amounts of BMP signaling activity. Researchers observed changes in dorsal-ventral patterning, for example, zebrafish deficient in certain BMPs showed a loss of dorsal sensory neurons and an expansion of interneurons.

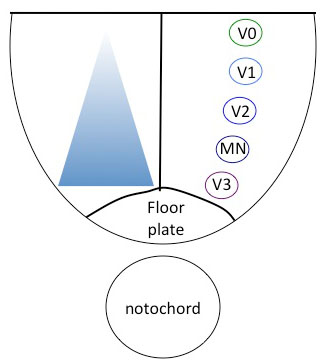
Shh secreted from the floor plate creates a gradient along the ventral neural tube. Shh functions in a concentration-dependent manner to specify ventral neuronal fates. V0-V3 represent four different classes of ventral interneurons, and MN indicates motor neurons.

== Immune System Changes ==
Studies suggest that immune system alterations occur during neural tube development and may contribute to neural tube defects (NTDs). Immune cells are activated in embryonic brain and spinal cord tissues, as well as in amniotic fluid derived cells. Macrophages exhibit both pro-inflammatory and anti-inflammatory functions and interact with developing neural cells. These immune neural interactions are mediated by cytokine signaling and pathways such as NF-κB and JAK–STAT. Several genes involved in both immune regulation and neural development have been proposed as potential prenatal diagnostic markers for NTDs.

== See also ==
- Neural fold
- Neural plate
- Neurulation
- Neural tube defects
- Cdx protein family
- List of human cell types derived from the germ layers
