= Neural plate =

Structure in an embryo which will become the nervous system

- Neural crest

Details
- Carnegie stage: 9
- Days: 19
- Precursor: Ectoderm
- Gives rise to: Neural folds
- System: Central nervous system

Identifiers
- Latin: lamina neuralis
- MeSH: D054258
- TE: plate_by_E5.13.1.0.1.0.1 E5.13.1.0.1.0.1

In embryology, the neural plate is a key developmental structure that serves as the basis for the nervous system. Cranial to the primitive node of the embryonic primitive streak, ectodermal tissue thickens and flattens to become the neural plate. The region anterior to the primitive node can be generally referred to as the neural plate. Cells take on a columnar appearance in the process as they continue to lengthen and narrow. The ends of the neural plate, known as the neural folds, push the ends of the plate up and together, folding into the neural tube, a structure critical to brain and spinal cord development. This process as a whole is termed primary neurulation.

Signaling proteins are also important in neural plate development, and aid in differentiating the tissue destined to become the neural plate. Examples of such proteins include bone morphogenetic proteins and cadherins. Expression of these proteins is essential to neural plate folding and subsequent neural tube formation.

== Involvement in primary neurulation ==
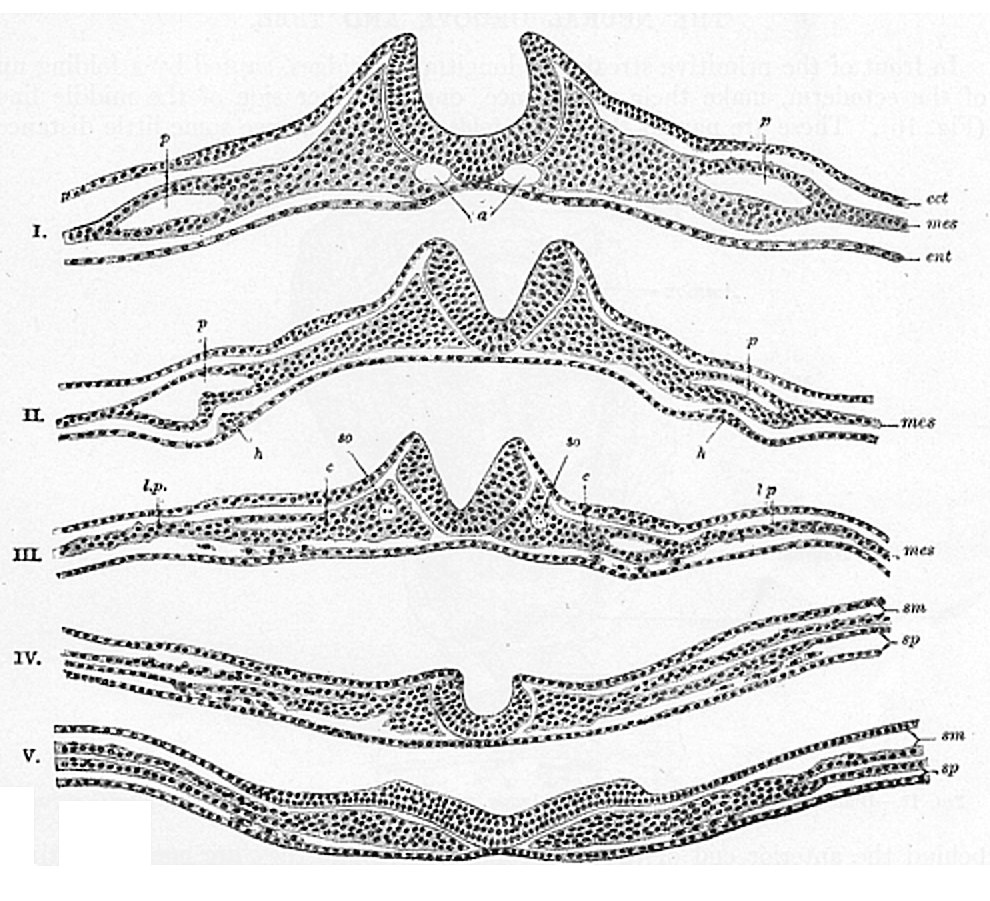
Uprising neural folds during the neurulation, parallel sections of a dog embryo

Generally divided into four, the process of primary neurulation involves the neural plate in the first three steps. The formation and folding of the neural plate is the first step in primary neurulation. This is followed by the refinement and growth of neural plate cells. The third step of primary neurulation does not involve the neural plate per se, but rather the edges of the neural plate, which come together, turning the plate into the start of the neural tube. With the neural plate having folded into a tube, the neural folds come together to complete the fusion of the neural tube. This process is illustrated in the figure to the right, where the neural plate is shown in purple. The lime green marks the edges of the neural plate, which become the neural folds, involved in the folding of the plate to create the neural tube. The figure demonstrates the development of the neural plate into the neural tube, which is where the neural crest cells are derived from as well.

In primary neurulation, the layer of ectoderm divides into three sets of cells: the neural tube (future brain and spinal cord), epidermis (skin), and neural crest cells (connects epidermis and neural tube and will migrate to make neurons, glia, and skin cell pigmentation).

== Development ==
During the stage of neural plate formation the embryo consists of three cell layers: the ectoderm that eventually forms the skin and neural tissues, the mesoderm that forms muscle and bone, and the endoderm that will form the cells lining the digestive and respiratory tracts. The progenitor cells that make up the precursors to neural tissues in the neural plate are called neuroepithelial cells.

Stretched over the notochord, the ectodermal cells on the dorsal portion of the embryo are ultimately the ones that form the neural plate. Approximately half of those cells will be induced to remain ectoderm, while the other half will form the neural plate.

There are four stages of neural plate and neural tube formation: formation, bending, convergence, and closure. The formation of the neural plate starts when dorsal mesoderm signals ectodermal cells above it to lengthen into columnar neural plate cells. This different shape distinguishes the cells of the presumptive neural plate from other pre-epidermal cells. If the neural plate is separated by itself, it will still develop to make a thinner plate but will not form a neural tube. If the region containing presumptive epidermis and neural plate tissue is isolated, small neural folds will form. Elongation that occurs throughout the formation of the neural plate and closure of the neural tube is vital; the closing areas of the neural tube are seen to have very increased elongation activity in the midline compared to already closed areas when the plate was beginning to shape itself into a tube.

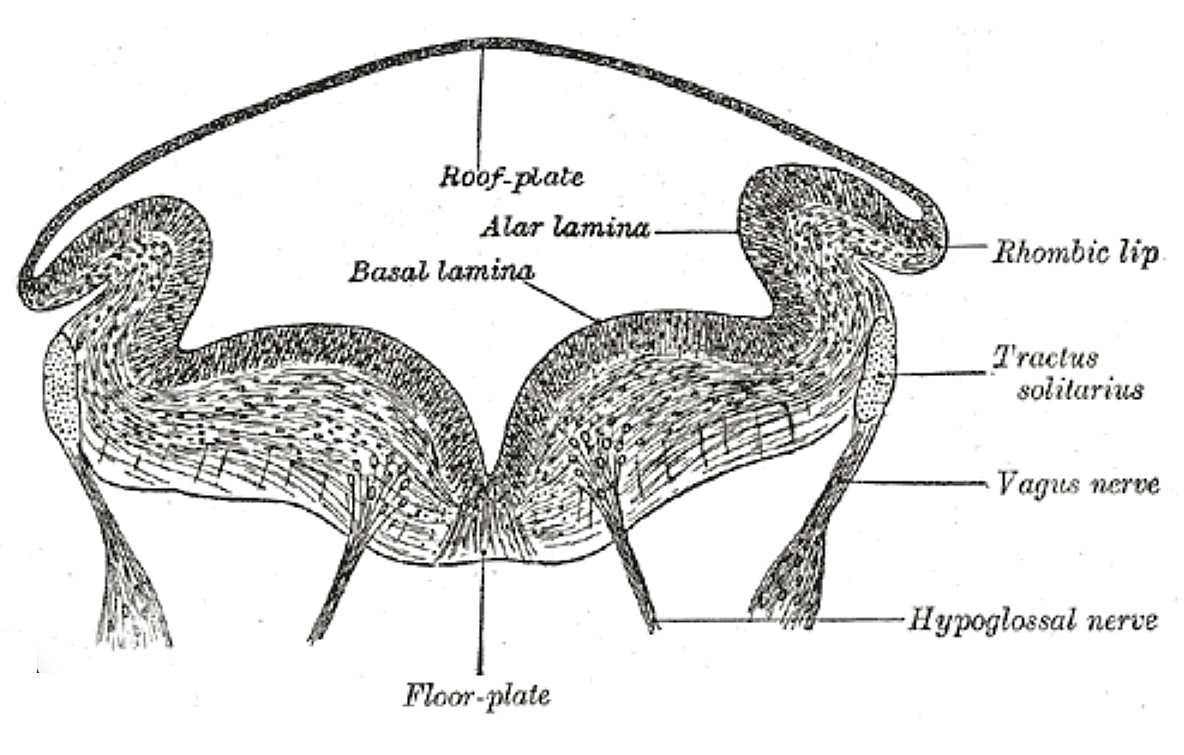
Bending and Convergence of the Neural Plate

The bending of the neural plate involves the formation of hinges, where the neural plate is connected to surrounding tissues. The midline of the neural plate is referred to the median hinge point (MHP). Cells in this area, known as medial hinge point cells because of their involvement with this structure, are stabilized and connected to the notochord. They are derived from the area of the neural plate anterior to primitive knot. The notochord will begin the shape changes in MHP cells. These cells will decrease in height and become wedge-shaped. Another type of hinge point occurs dorsal-laterally, referred to as dorsal-lateral hinge point (DLHP). These regions furrow and change shape in the same way as MHP cells do before connecting together to form the neural tube. It was seen in an experiment that without the notochord, the MHP characteristics did not develop correctly, so the neural plate and neural tube formation did not happen properly. The communication between the neural plate and the notochord is important for the future induction and formation of the neural tube.

Closure of the neural tube is completed when the neural folds are brought together, adhering to each other. While the cells that remain as the neural tube form the brain and spinal cord, the other cells that were part of the neural plate migrate away from the tube as neural crest cells. After an epithelial–mesenchymal transition, these cells form the autonomic nervous system and certain cells of the peripheral nervous system.

=== Cell signaling and essential proteins ===
Critical to the proper folding and function of the neural plate is N-cadherin, a type of cadherin protein associated with the nervous system. N-cadherin is critical to holding neural plate cells together. Additionally, cells destined to become neural plate cells express nerve cell adhesion molecule (NCAM) to further neural plate cohesion. Another cadherin, E-cadherin, is expressed by ectodermal cells in the process of neural plate development.

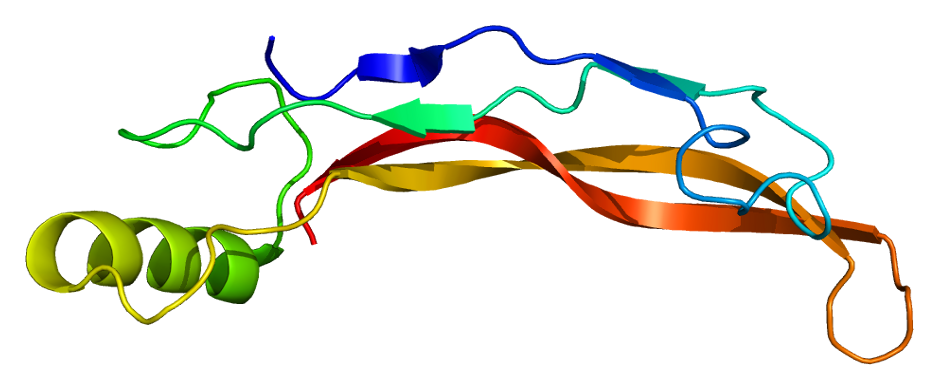
3-D structural model of BMP-4

Bone morphogenetic protein 4, or BMP4, is a transforming growth factor that causes the cells of the ectoderm to differentiate into skin cells. Without BMP4 the ectoderm cells would develop into neural cells. Axial mesoderm cells under the ectoderm secrete inhibitory signals called chordin, noggin and follistatin. These inhibitory signals prevent the action of BMP4, which would normally make the cells ectoderm; as a result, the overlying cells take their normal course and develop into neural cells. The cells in the ectoderm that circumscribe these neural cells do not receive the BMP4 inhibitor signals and as a result BMP4 induces these cells to develop into skin cells.

Neural plate border specifiers are induced as a set of transcription factors. Distalless-5, PAX3 and PAX7 prevent the border region from becoming either neural plate or epidermis. These induce a second set of transcription factors called neural crest specifiers, which cause cells to become neural crest cells.

In a newly formed neural plate, PAX3 mRNA, MSX1 mRNA, and MSX1/MSX2 proteins are expressed mediolaterally. When the neural plate begins to fold, rostral areas of the neural plate do not express Pax3 and MSX proteins. Areas caudal to neural tube closure have PAX3 and MSX expression restricted to lateral regions of the neural folds. These fluctuations in mRNA and protein expression allude to how they play a role in differentiation of neural plate cells.

Low pSMAD 1, 5, 8 levels allow a greater mobility at the median hinge point than in lateral neural plate cells. This flexibility allows for the pivoting and hinging that allows the buckling and lifting of the neural plate when formatting the neural tube. The neural plate has to be rigid enough for morphogenic movements to occur while being flexible enough to undergo shape and position changes for the transformation to the neural tube.

== Other animals ==
The neural tube closes differently in various species, the distinctions between humans and chickens being some of the most studied. In humans, the neural tube fuses together from a central region of the embryo and moves outwards. In chickens, neural tube closure begins at the future midbrain region and it closes in both directions. In birds and mammals, the closure does not occur at the same time.

In newt and general amphibian embryos, cell division is not a driving role in morphogenesis. Newt embryo cells are much larger and exhibit egg pigmentation to distinguish cells from each other. The newt neural plate doubles in length, decreases in apical width, and increases in thickness. The plate edges rise dorsally and fold toward the midline to form the neural tube. The apical surface area decreases.

In chicken embryos, while the neural plate increases in length and decreases in apical width, the thickness of the plate does not change drastically. As the neural plate progresses through the Hamburger-Hamilton stages, the plate thickens until about HH6-7, when the neural plate begins to fold into tube form. The apical surface area increases during neurulation, unlike amphibian embryos. In mouse embryos, there is a large convex-shaped curve to each side of the middle of the plate. This curve has to be reversed as the plate rolls together to form the neural tube.

== Research ==
Research on the neural plate began in earnest by looking into the determination of the ectoderm and its commitment to the neuronal path. With the development of research and laboratory techniques there have been major advances in the study of neurulation and the development and role of the neural plate in a growing embryo. The use of such techniques vary with the stage of development and overall research goals, but include such methods as cell labeling and grafting.

=== Cell labelling ===
The process of in situ hybridization (ISH) follows the labeling of a DNA or RNA sequence to serve as an antisense mRNA probe, complementary to a sequence of mRNA within the embryo. Labeling with a fluorescent dye or radioactive tag allows for the visualization of the probe and their location within the embryo. This technique is useful as it reveals specific areas of gene expression in a tissue as well as throughout an entire embryo through whole-mount in situ hybridization. This technique is often used in determination of gene expression necessary for the proper development of the embryo. Marking certain genes in a developing embryo allows for the determination of the exact time and place in which the gene is activated, offering information in the role of the particular gene in development.

Similar to the process of in situ hybridization, immunofluorescence (IF) also allows for the determination of particular cell element's roles in development. In contrast to in situ hybridization however, immunofluorescence uses a fluorophore attached to an antibody with biomolecule target, such as proteins, rather than DNA and RNA sequences. The allows for the visualization of biomolecule elements of the cell. In the study of embryogenesis immunofluorescence may be used for purposes similar to hybridization, for the tracking of proteins that are involved in the development of the embryo and their specific time and place of production and use. Current research has expanded on the immunofluorescence technique to combined it with the methods of in situ hybridization, either fluorescent or radioactive. This combination is believed to increase specificity and take away for the limitations of each individual technique. For example, this method with enhance counterstaining in a tissue and multiple protein labeling.

=== Cell grafting ===
Cell grafting in the early stages of embryo development has provided crucial information on cell fates and the processes of determination. Grafting at specific stages of neurulation has advanced research on the signaling necessary for the proper development of the neural plate and other structures. The grafting of the ectoderm and neural structures is very specialized and delicate procedure, requiring the removal and marking of a desired group of cells, followed by their transplantation, for example, into a new area of the embryo.

Grafting experiments done in Xenopus and chicken embryos show the neural plate's capability to induce other regions of cells, including the pre-placodal region, a group of ectodermal cells essential to the function of sensory organs.
