= Ectoderm =

Outer germ layer of embryonic development

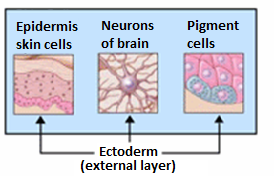
- Organs derived from ectoderm.

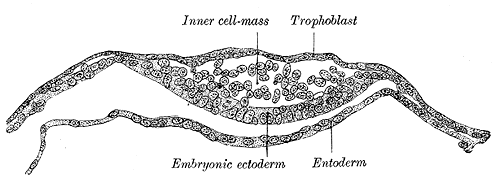
- Section through embryonic disk of Vespertilio murinus.

Details
- Days: 16

Identifiers
- MeSH: D004475
- FMA: 69070

The ectoderm is one of the three primary germ layers formed in early embryonic development. It is the outermost layer, and is superficial to the mesoderm (the middle layer) and endoderm (the innermost layer). It emerges and originates from the outer layer of germ cells. The word ectoderm comes from the Greek ektos meaning "outside", and derma meaning "skin".

Generally speaking, the ectoderm differentiates to form epithelial and neural tissues (spinal cord, nerves and brain). This includes the skin, linings of the mouth, anus, nostrils, sweat glands, hair and nails, and tooth enamel. Other types of epithelium are derived from the endoderm.

In vertebrate embryos, the ectoderm can be divided into two parts: the dorsal surface ectoderm also known as the external ectoderm, and the neural plate, which invaginates to form the neural tube and neural crest. The surface ectoderm gives rise to most epithelial tissues, and the neural plate gives rise to most neural tissues. For this reason, the neural plate and neural crest are also referred to as the neuroectoderm.

== History ==
Heinz Christian Pander, a Baltic German–Russian biologist, has been credited for the discovery of the three germ layers that form during embryogenesis. Pander received his doctorate in zoology from the University of Würzburg in 1817. He began his studies in embryology using chicken eggs, which allowed for his discovery of the ectoderm, mesoderm and endoderm. Due to his findings, Pander is sometimes referred to as the "founder of embryology".

Pander's work of the early embryo was continued by a Prussian–Estonian biologist named Karl Ernst von Baer. Baer took Pander's concept of the germ layers and through extensive research of many different types of species, he was able to extend this principle to all vertebrates. Baer also received credit for the discovery of the blastula. Baer published his findings, including his germ layer theory, in a textbook which translates to On the Development of Animals which he released in 1828.

== Differentiation ==
=== Initial appearance ===
The ectoderm can first be observed in amphibians and fish during the later stages of gastrulation. At the start of this process, the developing embryo has divided into many cells, forming a hollow ball called the blastula. The blastula is polar, and its two halves are called the animal hemisphere and vegetal hemisphere. It is the animal hemisphere will eventually become the ectoderm.

=== Early development ===
Like the other two germ layers – i.e., the mesoderm and endoderm – the ectoderm forms shortly after fertilization, after which rapid cell division begins. The position of the ectoderm relative to the other germ layers of the embryo is governed by "selective affinity", meaning that the inner surface of the ectoderm has a strong (positive) affinity for the mesoderm, and a weak (negative) affinity for the endoderm layer. This selective affinity changes during different stages of development. The strength of the attraction between two surfaces of two germ layers is determined by the amount and type of cadherin molecules present on the cells' surface. For example, the expression of N-cadherin is crucial to maintaining separation of precursor neural cells from precursor epithelial cells. Likewise, while the surface ectoderm becomes the epidermis, the neuroectoderm is induced along the neural pathway by the notochord, which is typically positioned above it.

==== Gastrulation ====
During the process of gastrulation, bottle cells invaginate on the dorsal surface of the blastula to form the blastopore. The cells continue to extend inward and migrate along the inner wall of the blastula to form a fluid-filled cavity called the blastocoel. The once superficial cells of the animal pole are destined to become the cells of the middle germ layer called the mesoderm. Through the process of radial extension, cells of the animal pole that were once several layers thick divide to form a thin layer. At the same time, when this thin layer of dividing cells reaches the dorsal lip of the blastopore, another process occurs termed convergent extension. During convergent extension, cells that approach the lip intercalate mediolaterally, in such a way that cells are pulled over the lip and inside the embryo. These two processes allow for the prospective mesoderm cells to be placed between the ectoderm and the endoderm. Once convergent extension and radial intercalation are underway, the rest of the vegetal pole, which will become endoderm cells, is completely engulfed by the prospective ectoderm, as these top cells undergo epiboly, where the ectoderm cells divide in a way to form one layer. This creates a uniform embryo composed of the three germ layers in their respective positions.

=== Later development ===
Once the three germ layers have been established, cellular differentiation can occur. The first major process here is neurulation, wherein the ectoderm differentiates to form the neural tube, neural crest cells and the epidermis. Each of these three components will give rise to a particular complement of cells. The neural tube cells give rise to the central nervous system, neural crest cells give rise to the peripheral and enteric nervous system, melanocytes, and facial cartilage, and the epidermal region will give rise to the epidermis, hair, nails, sebaceous glands, olfactory and oral epithelium, and eyes.

==== Neurulation ====
Neurulation occurs in two parts, primary and secondary neurulation. Both processes position neural crest cells between a superficial epidermal layer and the deep neural tube. During primary neurulation, the notochord cells of the mesoderm signal the adjacent, superficial ectoderm cells to reposition themselves into a columnar pattern to form cells of the ectodermal neural plate. As the cells continue to elongate, a group of cells immediately above the notochord change their shape, forming a wedge in the ectodermal region. These special cells are called medial hinge cells (MHPs). As the ectoderm continues to elongate, the ectodermal cells of the neural plate fold inward. The inward folding of the ectoderm by virtue of mainly cell division continues until another group of cells forms within the neural plate. These cells are termed dorsolateral hinge cells (DLHPs), and, once formed, the inward folding of the ectoderm stops. The DLHP cells function in a similar fashion as MHP cells regarding their wedge like shape, however, the DLHP cells result in the ectoderm converging. This convergence is led by ectodermal cells above the DLHP cells known as the neural crest. The neural crest cells eventually pull the adjacent ectodermal cells together, which leaves neural crest cells between the prospective epidermis and hollow, neural tube.

==== Organogenesis ====
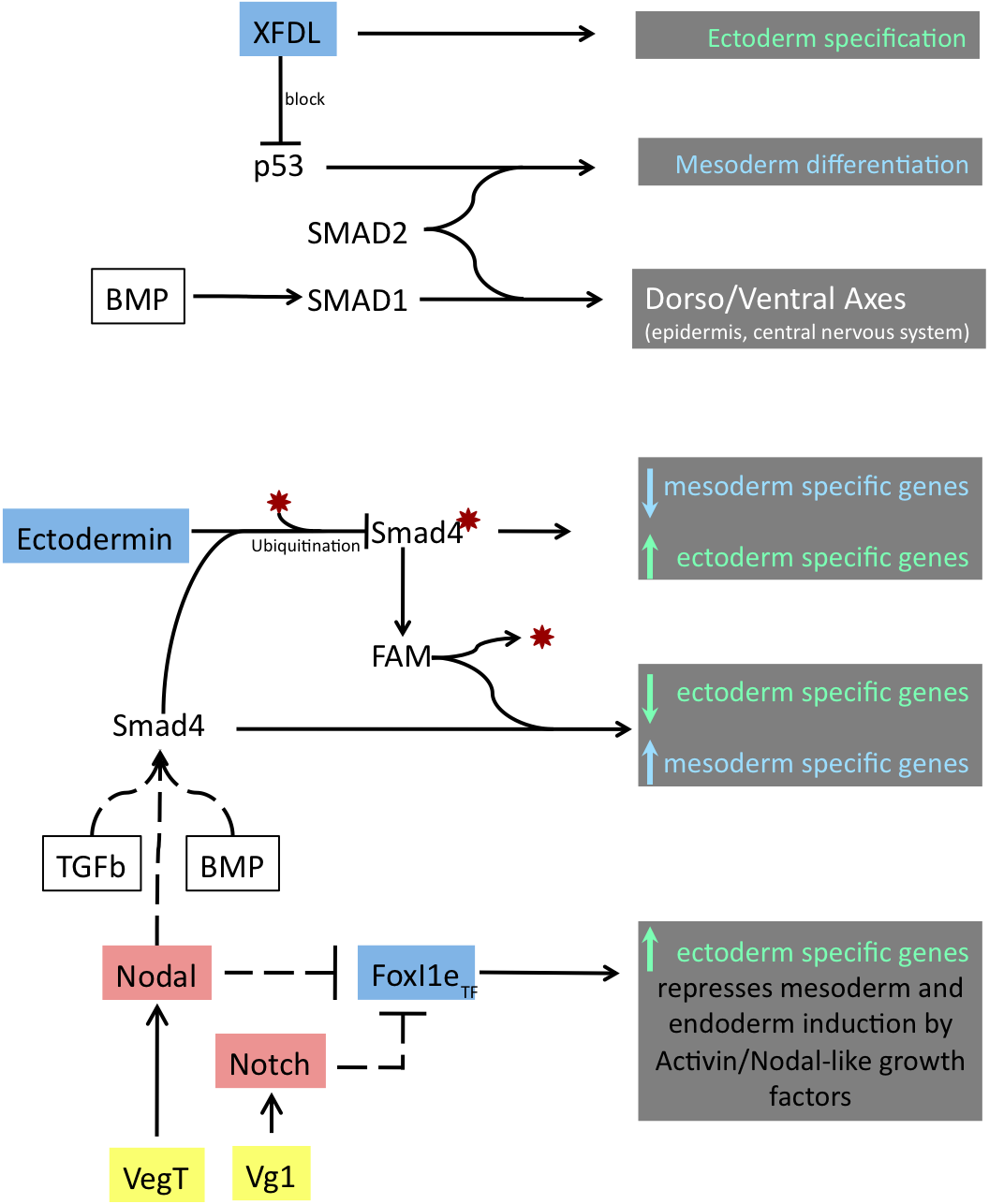
Ectodermal specification

All of the organs that rise from the ectoderm such as the nervous system, teeth, hair and many exocrine glands, originate from two adjacent tissue layers: the epithelium and the mesenchyme. Several signals mediate the organogenesis of the ectoderm such as: FGF, TGFβ, Wnt, and regulators from the hedgehog family. The specific timing and manner that the ectodermal organs form is dependent on the invagination of the epithelial cells. FGF-9 is an important factor during the initiation of tooth germ development. The rate of epithelial invagination in significantly increased by action of FGF-9, which is only expressed in the epithelium, and not in the mesenchyme. FGF-10 helps to stimulate epithelial cell proliferation, in order make larger tooth germs. Mammalian teeth develop from ectoderm derived from the mesenchyme: oral ectoderm and neural crest. The epithelial components of the stem cells for continuously growing teeth form from tissue layers called the stellate reticulum and the suprabasal layer of the surface ectoderm.

== Clinical significance ==
=== Ectodermal dysplasia ===
Ectodermal dysplasia is a rare but severe condition where the tissue groups (specifically teeth, skin, hair, nails and sweat glands) derived from the ectoderm undergo abnormal development. This is a diffuse term, as there are over 170 subtypes of ectodermal dysplasia. It has been accepted that the disease is caused by a mutation or a combination of mutations in certain genes. Research of the disease is ongoing, as only a fraction of the mutations involved with an ectodermal dysplasia subtype have been identified.

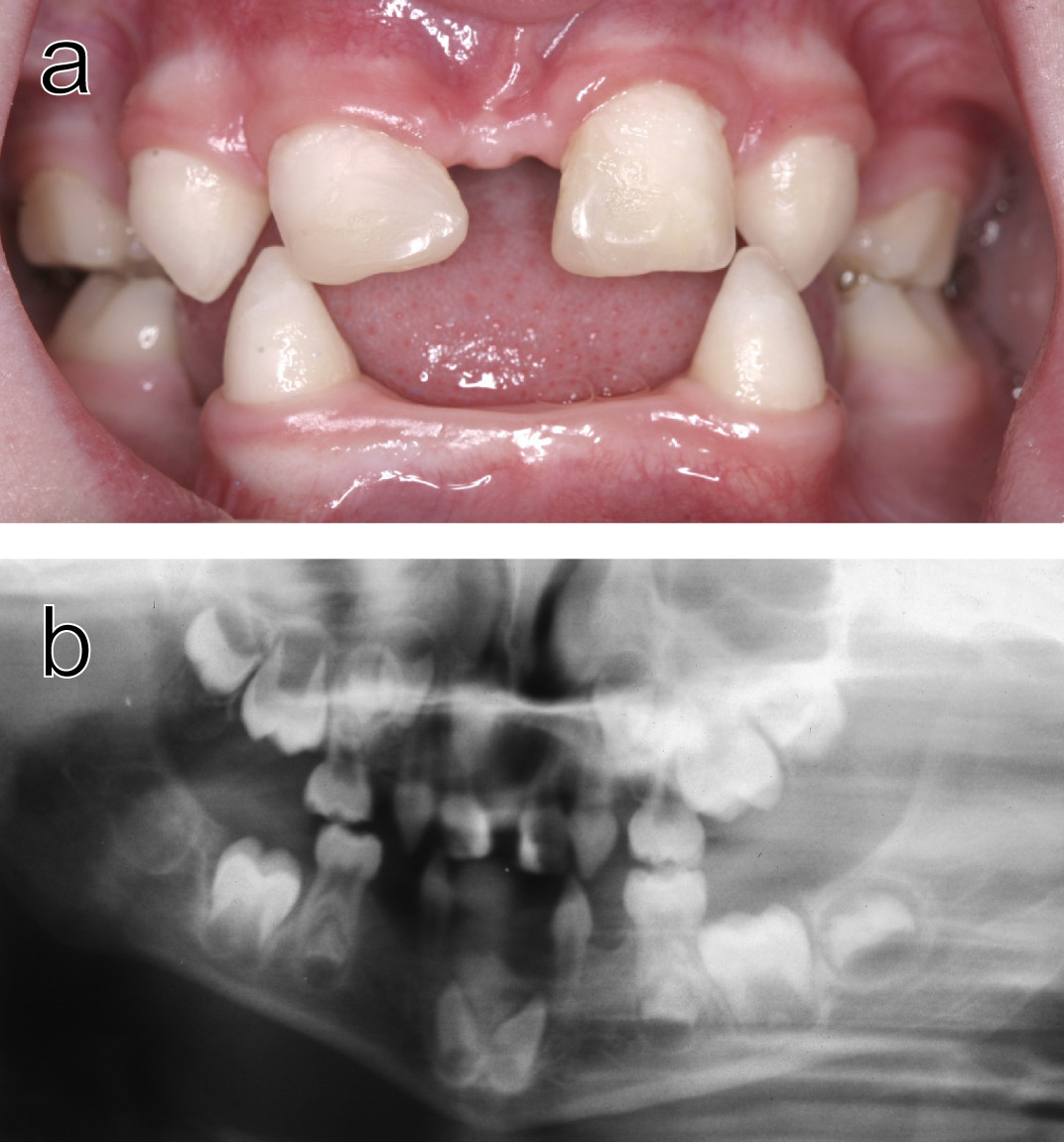
Dental abnormalities in a five-year-old girl from northern Sweden who suffered from various symptoms of autosomal dominant hypohidrotic ectodermal dysplasia (HED) a) Intraoral view. Note that the upper incisors have been restored with composite material to disguise their original conical shape. b) Orthopantomogram showing absence of ten primary and eleven permanent teeth in the jaws of the same individual.

Hypohidrotic ectodermal dysplasia (HED) is the most common subtype of the disease. Clinical cases of patients with this condition display a range of symptoms. The most relevant abnormality of HED is hypohidrosis, the inability to produce sufficient amounts of sweat, which is attributed to missing or dysfunctional sweat glands. This aspect represents a major handicap particularly in the summer, limits the patient's ability to participate in sports as well as his working capacity, and can be especially dangerous in warm climates where affected individuals are at risk of life-threatening hyperthermia. Facial malformations are also related to HED, such as pointed or absent teeth, wrinkled skin around the eyes, a misshaped nose along with scarce and thin hair. Skin problems like eczema are also observed in a number of cases. Most patients carry variants of the X-chromosomal EDA gene. This disease typically affects males more severely because they have only one X chromosome, while in females the second, usually unaffected X chromosome may be sufficient to prevent most symptoms.

== See also ==
- Ectoderm specification
- Coelom
- Embryology
- Endoderm
- Gastrulation
- Mesoderm
- Neural plate
- List of human cell types derived from the germ layers
