= Glossary of developmental biology =

This glossary of developmental biology is a list of definitions of terms and concepts commonly used in the study of developmental biology and related disciplines in biology, including embryology and reproductive biology, primarily as they pertain to vertebrate animals and particularly to humans and other mammals. The developmental biology of invertebrates, plants, fungi, and other organisms is treated in other articles; e.g terms relating to the reproduction and development of insects are listed in Glossary of entomology, and those relating to plants are listed in Glossary of botany.

This glossary is intended as introductory material for novices; for more specific and technical detail, see the article corresponding to each term. Additional terms relevant to vertebrate reproduction and development may also be found in Glossary of biology, Glossary of cell biology, Glossary of genetics, and Glossary of evolutionary biology.

== A ==
acrosomal vesicle
acrosome
allantois
One of four extraembryonic membranes formed during the development of amniotes, arising as a sac-like extension of the hindgut and having the dual function of excretion and respiration. In mammals, the allantois arises as a diverticulum made of splanchnopleure almost as soon as the hindgut is established, and quickly builds a dense network of circulatory vessels which eventually assumes responsibility for all metabolic interchange between the fetus and mother.
amniocentesis
amnion
One of four extraembryonic membranes formed during the development of animals belonging to the clade Amniota, all of which are terrestrial vertebrates. Arising from somatopleure very early in development, the amnion grows to surround and define the amniotic cavity, which contains amniotic fluid that cushions and protects the developing embryo from injury.
amniotic fluid
amniotic sac
archenteron

The central internal cavity of the gastrula in most animal embryos, fated to develop into the lumen of the digestive tube; the primitive gut. The archenteron initially has only one open end, known as the blastopore.

== B ==
birth
blastocoel

The fluid-filled or yolk-filled cavity that forms in the developing blastula or blastocyst in virtually all animal species. The blastocoel appears to serve two functions: it permits cell migration during gastrulation, and it prevents cells beneath it from interacting prematurely with cells above it by physically separating them.
blastocyst
blastodisc
blastomere
blastopore
blastula
An early form of the animal embryo generally consisting of a hollow sphere of cells (blastomeres) in a single layer (the blastoderm) surrounding a fluid-filled cavity (the blastocoel). Mammalian embryos develop into a specialized blastula known as a blastocyst, containing a differentiated inner cell mass and trophectoderm.
blastulation
A stage in the embryonic development of all animals defined by the formation of the blastula, following morulation and preceding gastrulation. During blastulation, the early embryo develops from a solid ball of cells called a morula into a hollow sphere consisting of an internal cavity surrounded by a single layer of blastomeres; a significant amount of embryonic activity is also dedicated to establishing cell polarity and the basic axes of the body plan, determining the fates of specific cells, activating the embryonic genome, and ultimately transferring full control of gene expression from the mother to the embryo. In mammals, blastulation results in a blastocyst, a specialized blastula marked by very early differentiation of cell populations.

== C ==
cavitation
The hollowing out of a fluid-filled space within a solid mass of cells, e.g. during blastulation or secondary neurulation.
chorion

1. One of four extraembryonic membranes formed during the development of amniotes, arising from trophoblast and somatopleure as a corollary of the amnion and enclosing both the amnion and the allantois. The chorion provides the fetal contribution to the formation of the placenta.
2. A tough coat surrounding the eggs of some insects and fish.
cleavage
concealed ovulation
conception

== D ==
delamination
deuterostome
developmental biology
diakinesis
dioestrus

In the mammalian estrous cycle, the long period of quiescence following ovulation, during which the uterus prepares to receive a fertilized ovum.
differentiation
diplonema
diplont
An organism having diploid somatic cells and haploid gametes.
diverticulum

== E ==
ectoderm
embryo
embryo transfer
embryoblast
Another name for the inner cell mass, i.e. that portion of the blastocyst that actually gives rise to embryonic tissues, as opposed to extraembryonic tissues.
embryogenesis

The growth and formation of the embryo; the course of development that occurs during the time period beginning with the fertilization of the ovum and ending when the developing animal can no longer be considered an embryo, the criteria for which may vary widely and arbitrarily depending on species. In humans, the embryonic period ends nine weeks after conception, after which time the term fetus is used instead of embryo. In many other animals, embryogenesis is considered complete only after hatching or birth.
embryology
embryonate
Containing a developing embryo; e.g. an embryonated hen's egg, as opposed to an unfertilized egg.
endoderm
endometrium
epiblast
epiboly
estrous cycle

== F ==
Fallopian tubes
false amnion
See chorion.
fate map
A diagram that shows what will become of each region of the embryo during the course of normal development. Fate maps are created by selectively marking populations of cells in distinct regions of the early embryo with distinct visual reporters (by any of a variety of methods designed to permit easy visualization of the marked cells, e.g. vital stains, fluorescent compounds, or retroviral transfection) and then allowing the embryo to proceed normally through the subsequent stages of development, after which each specific reporter can again be visualized, thereby revealing the new positions and morphologies of the marked cells and/or their daughter cells. Visualizing the reporters at two or more different developmental stages shows how the different parts of the embryo have moved and changed over time.
fertilization
follicle-stimulating hormone (FSH)

== G ==
gastrocoel
See archenteron.
gastrula
gastrulation
A stage in the embryonic development of most animals defined by the formation of the gastrula, following blastulation and preceding neurulation. During gastrulation, the blastula or blastocyst undergoes a major reorganization from a single, continuous layer of cells surrounding a single cavity into the complex, multilayered, multicavity gastrula, in which all of the primordial germ layers are present. Though the precise pattern of morphogenetic changes constituting gastrulation varies considerably between species, all types of gastrulation are unified by five basic classes of cell movements: the invagination of one side of the blastula into the blastocoel; the involution of the inner layer of cells over the basal surface of the outer layer; the ingression of individual cells into the embryo; the delamination of one layer into two layers via splitting or migration; and the epiboly or expansion of one layer over other cells or layers. By the end of gastrulation, the cells of the embryo have begun differentiation into distinct lineages, the basic axes of the body plan have been established (e.g. dorsal-ventral, anterior-posterior, etc.), and one or more layers of cells have been internalized, including the prospective gut.
germ cell
germ layer
gonad

== H ==
histogenesis
The process by which the definite cells and tissues that make up the body of an organism arise from embryonic cells; or, more generally, the generation of new tissues at any stage of life.
hypoblast

== I ==
in vitro fertilization (IVF)
ingression
inner cell mass
invagination
involution

== L ==
leptonema
Leydig cell

== M ==
meiosis
meiotic arrest
mesoderm
mid-blastula transition (MBT)
morula
A very early form of the animal embryo consisting of a solid ball of 16 to 32 blastomeres. By the morula stage, these cells have become flattened and have begun to develop stronger cell-to-cell adhesion, as well as to pump fluid into an internal cavity that will eventually become the blastocoel.

== N ==
neonatal
neurula
neurulation
notochord

== O ==
oestrous cycle
See estrous cycle.
oocyte
oogenesis
organogenesis
ovary
oviduct
ovulation
ovum

== P ==
pachynema
parthenogenesis
parturition
placenta
polar body
postimplantation
postnatal
postpartum
preimplantation
prenatal
primary spermatocyte
primitive streak
primordium
pronucleus
Either of the haploid gametic nuclei, i.e. that of the ovum or sperm, as they exist prior to syngamy. The female pronucleus is formed during oogenesis at the time of the second meiotic division, which occurs before fertilization; in contrast, the nucleus of a spermatozoon is generally only considered a pronucleus after fertilization, once it is inside the cytoplasm of the egg and has begun to decondense.
protoblast
protostome

== R ==
reproductive biology

== S ==
secondary spermatocyte
semen
serosa
See chorion.
Sertoli cell
somatic cell nuclear transfer (SCNT)
somatopleure
somite
sperm
spermatid
spermatocyte
spermatogonium
spermiogenesis
splanchnopleure
superovulation

== T ==
teratogen
testis
trophectoderm
trophoblast

== U ==
uterus

== V ==
vas deferens

== Z ==
zona pellucida
zygonema
zygote
zygotic genome activation (ZGA)

== See also ==
- Introduction to developmental biology
- Outline of developmental biology
- Outline of cell biology
- Glossary of biology
- Glossary of cell biology
- Glossary of genetics
- Glossary of evolutionary biology
