= Blastoderm =

A blastoderm (germinal disc, blastodisc), also called the cicatricula, is a single layer of embryonic epithelial tissue that makes up the blastula. It encloses the fluid-filled blastocoel. Gastrulation follows blastoderm formation, where the tips of the blastoderm begins the formation of the ectoderm, mesoderm, and endoderm.

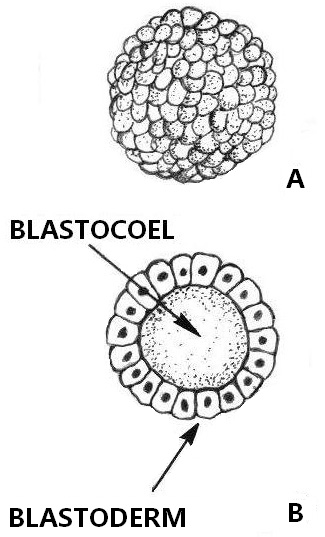

== Formation ==
The blastoderm is formed when the oocyte plasma membrane begins cleaving by invagination, creating multiple cells that arrange themselves into an outer sleeve to the blastocoel.

== In oviparous animals ==
In chicken eggs, the blastoderm represents a flat disc after embryonic fertilization. At the edge of the blastoderm is the site of active migration by most cells.

DNA repair genes are highly expressed in chicken blastoderms.

== See also ==
- Blastodisc
- Embryology
- Cleavage
- Gastrulation
