= Cavitation (embryology) =

Process in early embryonic development

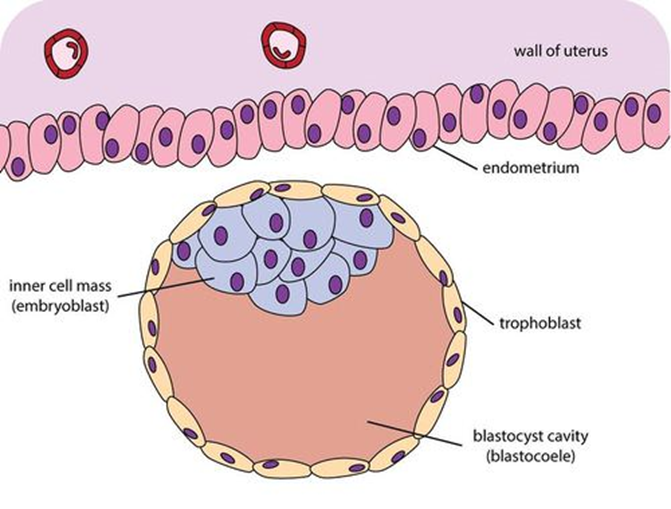
After the process of cavitation occurs the blastocoel forms.

Cavitation is a process in early embryonic development that follows cleavage. Cavitation is the formation of the blastocoel, a fluid-filled cavity that defines the blastula, or in mammals the blastocyst. After fertilization, cell division of the zygote occurs which results in the formation of a solid ball of cells (blastomeres) called the morula. Further division of cells increases their number in the morula, and the morula differentiates them into two groups. The internal cells become the inner cell mass, and the outer cells become the trophoblast. Before cell differentiation takes place there are two transcription factors, Oct-4 and nanog that are uniformly expressed on all of the cells, but both of these transcription factors are turned off in the trophoblast once it has formed.

The trophoblast cells form tight junctions between them making the structure leakproof. Trophoblast cells have sodium pumps on their membranes, and pump sodium into the centre of the morula. This draws fluid in through osmosis causing a cavity to form inside the morula, and to increase in size. The cavity is the blastocoel. Following the formation of the blastocoel, the inner cell mass positions itself in one portion of the cavity, while the rest of the cavity is filled with fluid, and lined with trophoblasts.

== See also ==
- Lung cavity
