= C3orf56 =

Protein encoding gene

Identifiers
- Aliases: C3orf56, chromosome 3 open reading frame 56
- External IDs: GeneCards: C3orf56

Gene location (Human)
Chr.	Chromosome 3 (human)
Band	3q21.3	Start	127,193,131 bp
Band	3q21.3	End	127,198,185 bp
RNA expression pattern
Bgee	Human / Mouse (ortholog); Top expressed in: oocyte; secondary oocyte; gonad; testicle; right testis; left testis; serous sac; connective tissue; abdominal fat; abdominal wall / n/a; More reference expression data
BioGPS	n/a
Orthologs
Databases	NCBI: entry; OMA: entry
Species	Human	Mouse
Entrez	285311	n/a
Ensembl	ENSG00000214324	n/a
UniProt	Q8N813	n/a
RefSeq (mRNA)	NM_001007534	n/a
RefSeq (protein)	NP_001007535	n/a
Location (UCSC)	Chr 3: 127.19 – 127.2 Mb	n/a
PubMed search		n/a
- Wikidata
View/Edit Human

C3orf56 is a protein encoding gene found on chromosome 3. Although, the structure and function of the protein is not well understood, it is known that the C3orf56 protein is exclusively expressed in metaphase II of oocytes and degrades as the oocyte develops towards the blastocyst stage. Degradation of the C3orf56 protein suggests that this gene plays a role in the progression from maternal to embryonic genome and in embryonic genome activation.

== Gene ==
The C3orf56 gene is positioned at 3q21.3 on the plus strand and is 5,055 base pairs in length. The gene occupies base pair 127193131 to 127198185. C3orf56 has two aliases: FLJ40141 and LOC285311.

== Transcript ==
The primary assembly contains 2 exons and is 242 amino acids in length.

== Protein ==
C3orf56 has a predicted molecular weight of 26 kdal and an isoelectric point of 8.48.

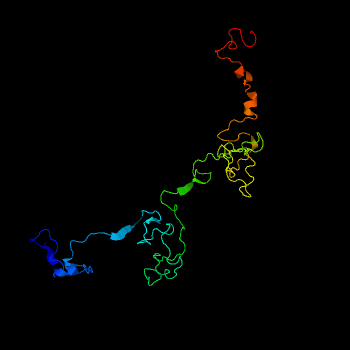
Predicted tertiary structure of C3orf56.

=== Primary structure ===
C3orf56 is rich in proline, serine, and tryptophan. It has one highly conserved internal repeat which spans from G85 to P125 and G146 to P178.

=== Secondary structure ===
Only one highly conserved alpha helical structure was predicted.

=== Tertiary structure ===
The tertiary structure of C3orf56 was predicted with a confidence score of -3.08. It is suggested to possess many hydrogen bonds and salt bridges.

=== Protein-protein interactions ===
C3orf56 has been predicted to interact with tyrosine-protein kinase transmembrane receptor (ROR2) and oocyte-expressed protein homolog (OOEP).

== Gene level regulation ==
=== Expression ===
C3orf56 has shown to be over-expressed in the testes. Relative to the expression of all other genes, C3orf56 has shown an almost absence of expression in human tissues (excluding the ovary) than in metaphase II oocytes. C3orf56 also has an expression relatively lower in the 8-cell embryo stage and significantly lower in the morula and blastocyst stages compared to the 1-cell, 2-cell, and 4-cell stages.

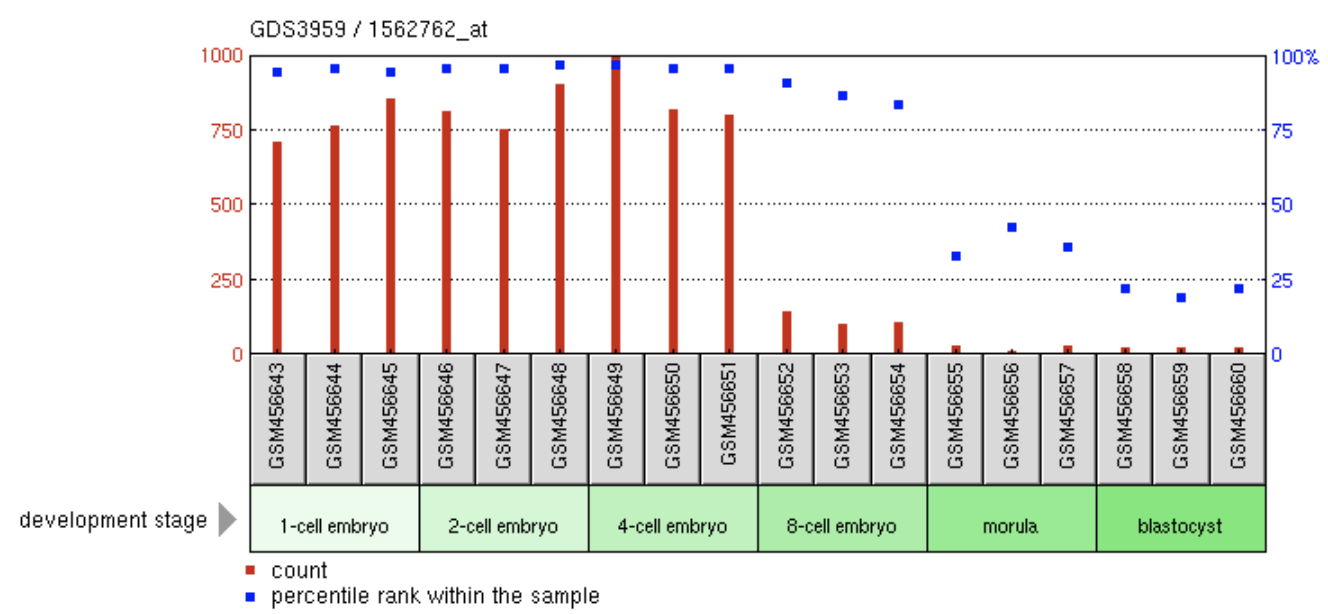
C3orf56 expression throughout embryonic development.

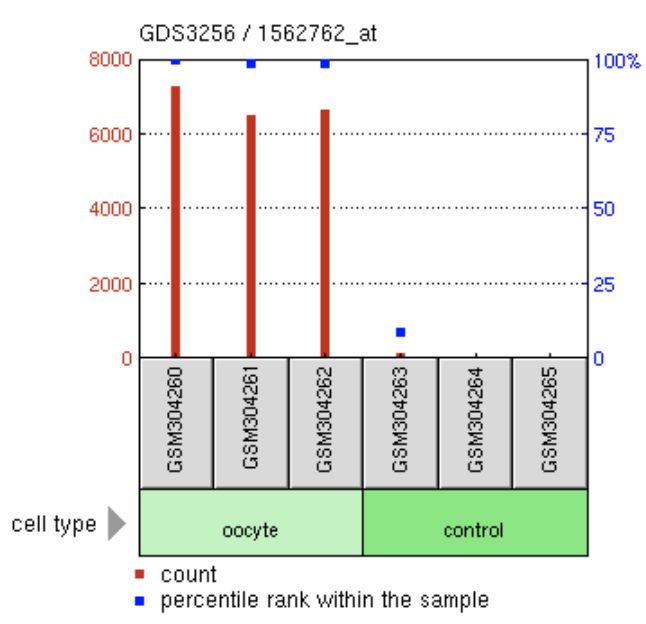
C3orf56 expression in oocytes.

=== RNA binding proteins and transcription factors ===
RNA binding proteins seem to be conserved within the 5’ UTR and show some functional significance with sex and development. Many predicted transcription factors also demonstrated a functional importance in development.

== Transcript level regulation ==
=== Predicted stem loops ===
Hypothetical stem loops appear to be slightly more prevalent in the 3’ UTR sequence with more conservation of stem loops in the 5’ UTR sequence.

== Protein level regulation ==
=== Post-translational modifications ===
C3orf56 has many predicted post-translational modifications. Predicted protein kinase C phosphorylation sites were found at and S6-K8, K181-C183, and S228-R230. Predicted casein kinase II phosphorylation sites at S109-S112, S213-E186, and S218-L220. General phosphorylation sites were predicted at T3, S6, S21, S109, T160, and S227. N-myristoylation sites were predicted to be found at G2-E7, G26-S31, G38-S43, and G146-S151.

=== Localization ===
A potential nuclear localization signal was found at position P231 to R238 along with a suggested nuclear tendency.

== Evolutionary history ==
The earliest appearance of the C3orf56 gene was approximately 102 million years ago within the species Orycteropus afer. Compared to the speed at which the proteins fibrinogen alpha and cytochrome c evolved, C3orf56 evolves very rapidly. This relationship was limited to more recently diverged species.

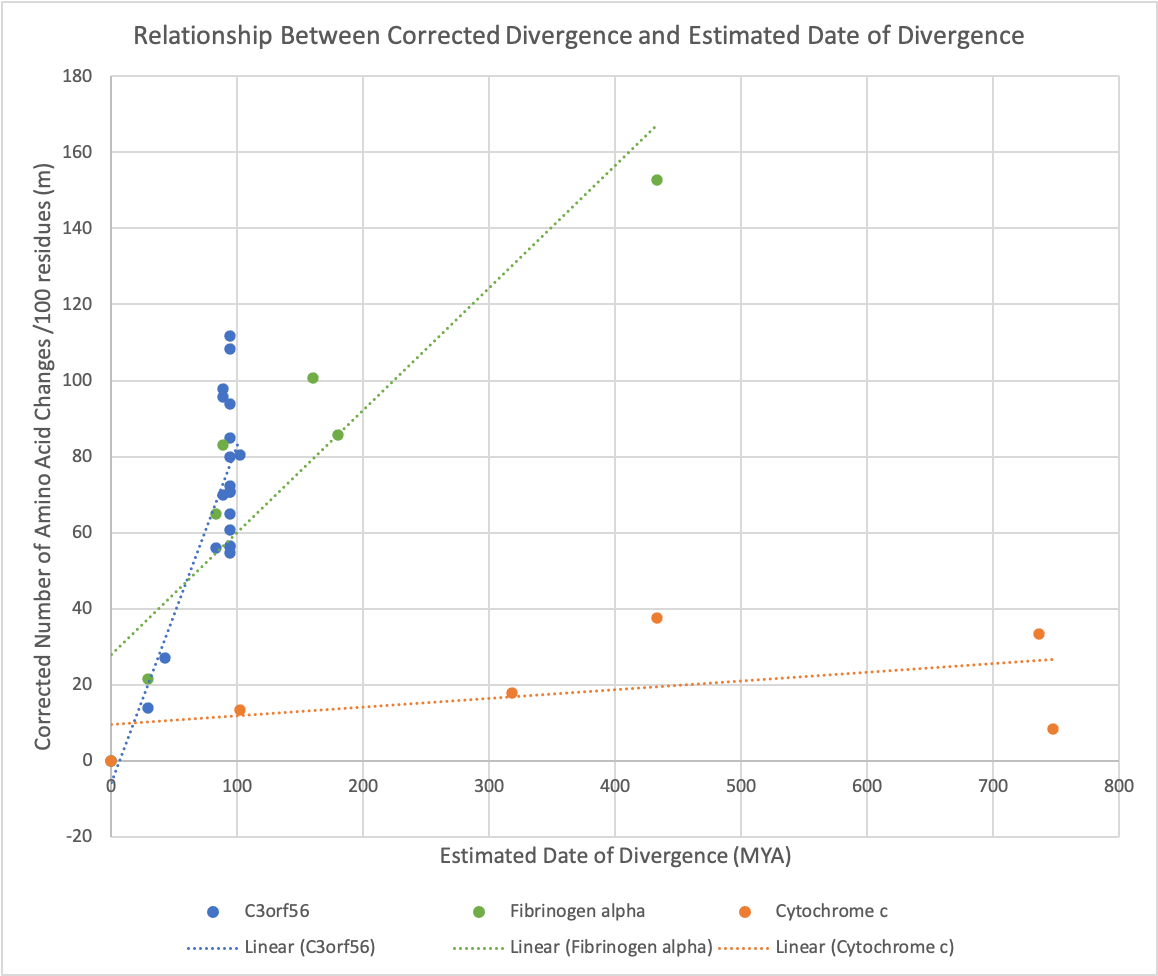
The corrected % divergence (m) was calculated and plotted against date of divergence (MYA) for proteins C3orf56, fibrinogen alpha, and cytochrome c.

=== Homology ===
C3orf56 has numerous orthologs that are only within various placental mammals. No known paralogs of C3orf56 exist at this time.

Table 1 Orthologs of C3orf56
Genus and Species	Common Name	Taxonmic Order	Date of Divergence (MYA)	Accession Number	Sequence Length (aa)	% Sequence Identity	% Sequence Similarity
Homo sapiens	Human	Primate	0	NP_001007535.1	242	100	100
Rhinopithecus bieti	Black Snub-nosed Monkey	Primate	29	XP_017740448.1	248	87	89
Saimiri boliviensis boliviensis	Bolivian Squirrel Monkey	Primate	43	XP_003944171.1	249	76	79
Galeopterus variegatus	Flying Lemur	Dermoptera	83	XP_008592749.1	222	57	64
Castor canadensis	Beaver	Rodentia	89	XP_020010355.1	204	50	56
Jaculus jaculus	Lesser Egyptian Jerboa	Rodentia	89	XP_012805719.1	226	38	49
Heterocephalus glaber	Naked Mole Rat	Rodentia	89	XP_012924683.1	264	38	49
Mirounga leonina	Southern Elephant Seal	Carnivora	94	XP_034854170.1	178	57	64
Phocoena sinus	Vaquita	Artiodactyla	94	XP_032503804.1	236	57	61
Eumetopias jubatus	Northern Sea Lion	Carnivora	94	XP_027957377.1	195	54	64
Canis lupus familiaris	Dog	Carnivora	94	XP_022263109.1	232	53	60
Ailuropoda melanoleuca	Panda	Carnivora	94	XP_011228030.2	175	52	58
Equus caballus	Horse	Perissodactyla	94	XP_014584106.2	240	49	58
Sus scrofa	Wild Boar	Cetartiodactyla	94	XP_020926903.1	231	49	56
Vicugna pacos	Alpaca	Artiodactyla	94	XP_031532218.1	366	49	56
Camelus dromedarius	Arabian Camel	Artiodactyla	94	XP_031325652.1	233	45	53
Enhydra lutris kenyoni	Sea Otter	Carnivora	94	XP_022377075.1	247	43	50
Crocuta crocuta	Hyena	Carnivora	94	KAF0873334.1	216	39	46
Bison bison bison	Bison	Artiodactyla	94	XP_010857995.1	273	34	21
Monodon monoceros	Narwahl	Cetacea	94	TKC45752.1	265	33	43
Orycteropus afer	Aardvark	Tubulidentata	102	XP_007951414.1	113	45	54
