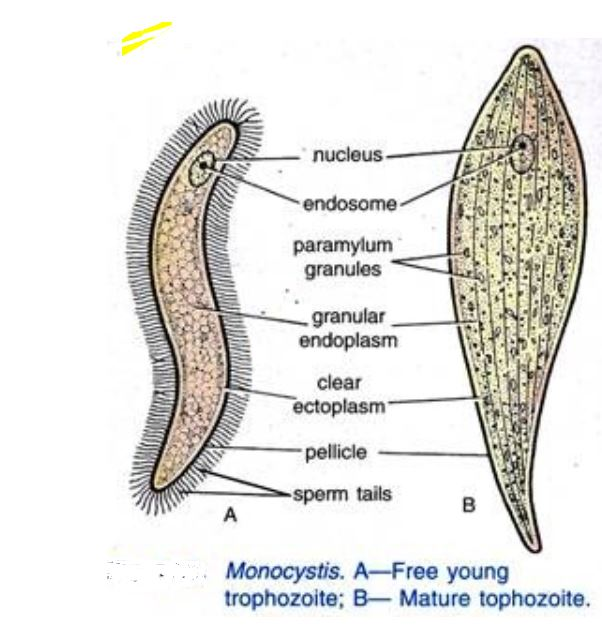

Scientific classification
- Domain: Eukaryota
- Clade: Sar
- Superphylum: Alveolata
- Phylum: Apicomplexa
- Class: Conoidasida
- Order: Eugregarinorida
- Family: Monocystidae
- Subfamily: Monocystinae
- Genus: Monocystis; Stein, 1848

= Monocystis =

Genus of single-celled organisms

Monocystis (Gr., monos, single + kystisis, bladder) is a genus (the type of the family Monocystidae) of acephaline gregarines (subclass Gregarinasina) not having the protoplasm divided into segments by septa and including internal parasites of invertebrates (as M. agilis of the reproductive system of earthworms).

== Habit and habitat ==
Monocystis lives as an intracellular parasite in its young stage, when it lives in the bundle of developing sperm. It becomes extracellular in its mature stage, living in the contents of seminal vesicles of earthworms. Its infection is so widespread that practically all mature earthworms are found parasitized by this parasite.

== Structure ==
The mature adult of Monocystis is a feeding stage called a trophozoite. The young trophozoite lives in the sperm morula (group of developing sperm) of the host; it feeds and grows at the expense of the protoplasm of the developing sperm until all the protoplasm is exhausted and it is surrounded by the tails of the dead sperm cells. In this stage, it is sometimes mistaken for a ciliated organism, but the sperm tails soon detach from its body and the trophozoite becomes free. The adult is an elongated, spindle-shaped, flattened, wormlike creature. Its body is covered by a thick, smooth, and permeable pellicle. The cytoplasm is well differentiated into ectoplasm and endoplasm, the latter containing a large vesicular nucleus. Its nutrition is sporozoic. There are no locomotory organs, but it shows wriggling and gliding movements.
