= Mesentoblast =

Cells from which the mesoderm originates

Mesentoblasts, also called 4d cells, are the cells from which the mesoderm originates. Mesentoblasts are found in the blastopore area between the endoderm and the ectoderm. In protostomes the embryos are mosaic, so mesentoblast removal will result in failure of formation of the mesoderm and other structures related to the mesoderm, which in turn will give abnormal embryos. The mesentoblast migrates to the blastocoel where it reproduces to form a mass of cells that becomes the mesoderm.
