= Preimplantation embryo =

Series of cells formed before the embryo

In human embryonic development, a preimplantation embryo is an embryonic stage before it becomes implanted in the uterus. The term pre-embryo previously put forward as an alternative has fallen out of use.

== Preimplantation in human embryonic development ==
The word pre-embryo is sometimes used in ethical contexts to refer to a human embryo at least between fertilization and implantation, though this term has not been adopted by the scientific community. The stage is more recognised as the preimplantation embryo.

Implantation begins about six days after fertilization, and lasts for about a week, during which time formation of the primitive streak occurs.

Use of the term pre-embryo, in the context of human development, has drawn criticism from opponents of embryo research. From scientists who have considered this categorization invalid or unnecessary. One rationale that has been advanced for distinguishing an early fertilized human conceptus from an embryo is that there is a potential for the conceptus to split into identical twins prior to implantation, and so (the argument goes) the conceptus cannot be regarded before implantation as a single human being. However, the conceptus before implantation exhibits self-actuated activity, which has led to the assertion that it is an embryo.

== Ontological status ==
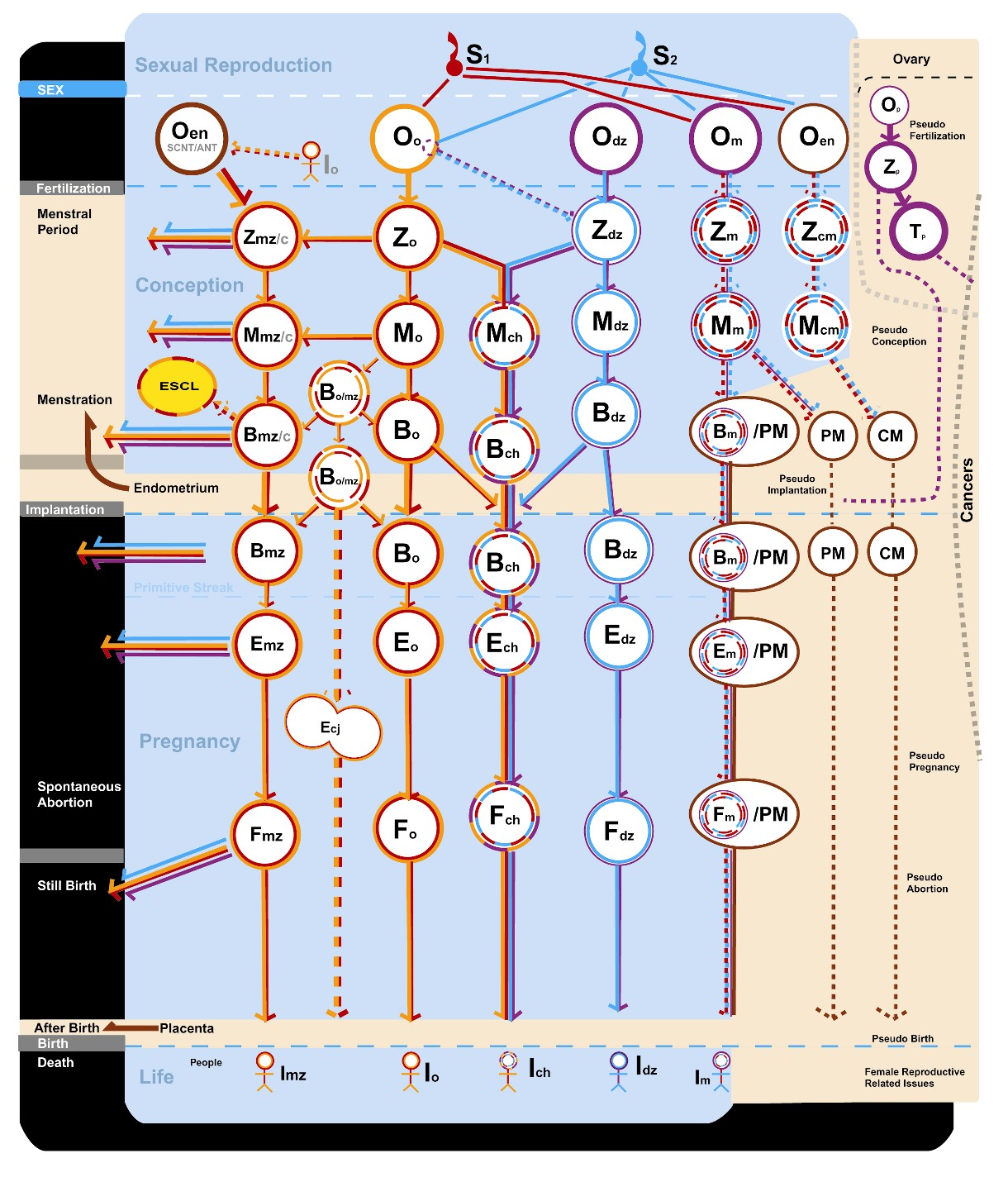
The ontological status of the preembryo, embryo, and fetus

The illustration shows the ontological status of the preembryo, embryo, and fetus:

- (o) indicates the (natural &) standard reproductive and embryogenic pathway
- (mz) indicates all the possible pathways for a monozygotic twin (see Scott, 2002, Hall, 2003, for a review on monozygotic twinning)
- (/c) indicates a clone created by either SCNT or ANT (See Hurlbut, 2005, and section III. Pluripotent Stem Cells Derived from Biological Artifacts in the PCBE's Report on alternative sources of stem cells for a review of ANT))
- (ch) indicates all the possible pathways for a chimeric individual (see Charles E. Boklage, 2006, for a review on chimerism and twinning)
- (dz) indicates the pathway of a dizygotic twin
- (en) indicates an enucleated oocyte
- (m) indicates a hydatidiform mole
- (cm) indicates a complete hydatidiform mole
- (pm) indicates a partial hydatidiform mole, and
- (p) indicates parthenogenesis.
- (O) indicates an oocyte,
- (Z) indicates a zygote,
- (M) indicates a morula,
- (B) indicates a blastocyst,
- (E) indicates an embryo,
- (F) indicates a fetus,
- (I) indicates a live born individual person.
- (PM) indicates a partial hydatidiform mole,
- (CM) indicates a complete hydatidiform mole,
- (T) indicates a teratoma.

The colors represent the maternal and paternal genetic contributions.

== See also ==
- Beginning of pregnancy controversy
- In vitro fertilization
- Pregnancy
- Preimplantation genetic diagnosis
- Stem cell controversy
