= Pluriblast =

Embryoblast of metatherian mammals, analogous to the inner cell mass of eutherians

The pluriblast is a pluripotent population of cells in the embryogenesis of marsupials, called the inner cell mass in eutherians. The pluriblast is distinct from the trophoblast, and gives rise to the germ layers of the embryo, as well as extra embryonic endoderm and extra embryonic mesoderm. Both the pluriblast and trophoblast arise from the totipotent cells of the early conceptus. By definition, the pluriblast does not give rise to trophoblast cells during normal development, although it may retain this potential under experimental conditions.

In metatherians (marsupials), the pluriblast forms part of the blastocyst wall and no structure exists that can be described as an inner cell mass. "Inner cell mass" is thus a morphological term peculiar to eutherian mammals, whereas "pluriblast" is a functional term more widely applicable to conserved aspects of mammalian development.
