= Zygocystinae =

Scientific classification
- Domain: Eukaryota
- Clade: Sar
- Clade: Alveolata
- Phylum: Apicomplexa
- Class: Conoidasida
- Order: Eugregarinorida
- Family: Monocystidae
- Subfamily: Zygocystinae; Bhatia, 1930

Genera
- Adelphocystis; Pleurocystis; Zygocystis

Subfamily of single-celled organisms

Zygocystinae is a subfamily of parasites in the phylum Apicomplexa.

== Taxonomy ==
There are three genera in this subfamily: Adelphocystis, Pleurocystis and Zygocystis.

== History ==
This family was described by Bhatia in 1930.

== Description ==
Species in this subfamily infect worms of the family Lumbricidae.

In these genera syzygy occurs extremely early in the life cycle.

The oocyst is navicular or biconical and has unusual thickenings at both ends.
