= Blastulation =

Stage in embryonic development

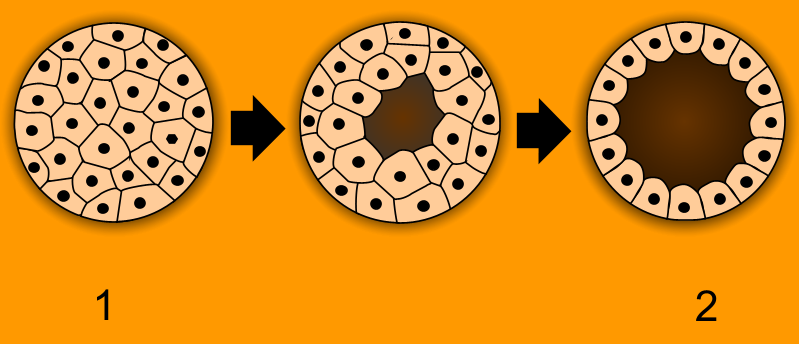
- Blastulation: from 1. morula to 2. blastula

Details
- Days: 4
- Precursor: Morula
- Gives rise to: Gastrula

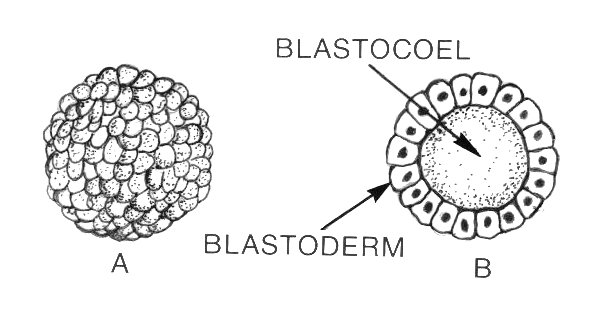
A. Morula and B. cross section of a blastula displaying the blastocoel and blastoderm of early animal embryonic development

Blastulation is the stage in early animal embryonic development that produces the blastula. In mammalian development, a blastula develops into the blastocyst with a differentiated inner cell mass and an outer trophectoderm. The blastula (from Greek βλαστός (blastos meaning sprout)) is a hollow sphere of cells known as blastomeres surrounding an inner fluid-filled cavity called the blastocoel. Embryonic development begins with a sperm fertilizing an egg cell to become a zygote, which undergoes many cleavages to develop into a ball of cells called a morula. Only when the blastocoel is formed does the early embryo become a blastula. The blastula precedes the formation of the gastrula in which the germ layers of the embryo form.

A common feature of a vertebrate blastula is that it consists of a layer of blastomeres, known as the blastoderm, which surrounds the blastocoel. In mammals, the blastocyst contains an embryoblast (or inner cell mass) that will eventually give rise to the definitive structures of the fetus, and a trophoblast which goes on to form the extra-embryonic tissues.

During blastulation, a significant amount of activity occurs within the early embryo to establish cell polarity, cell specification, axis formation, and to regulate gene expression. In many animals, such as Drosophila and Xenopus, the mid blastula transition (MBT) is a crucial step in development during which the maternal mRNA is degraded and control over development is passed to the embryo's own DNA. Many of the interactions between blastomeres are dependent on cadherin expression, particularly E-cadherin in mammals and EP-cadherin in amphibians.

The study of the blastula, and of cell specification has many implications in stem cell research, and assisted reproductive technology. In Xenopus, blastomeres behave as pluripotent stem cells which can migrate down several pathways, depending on cell signaling. By manipulating the cell signals during the blastula stage of development, various tissues can be formed. This potential can be instrumental in regenerative medicine for disease and injury cases. In vitro fertilisation involves the transfer of an embryo into a uterus for implantation.

== Development ==
The blastula stage of early embryo development begins with the appearance of the blastocoel. The origin of the blastocoel in Xenopus has been shown to be from the first cleavage furrow, which is widened and sealed with tight junctions to create a cavity.

In many organisms the development of the embryo up to this point and for the early part of the blastula stage is controlled by maternal mRNA, so called because it was produced in the egg prior to fertilization and is therefore exclusively from the mother.

=== Midblastula transition ===
In many organisms including Xenopus and Drosophila, the midblastula transition usually occurs after a particular number of cell divisions for a given species, and is defined by the ending of the synchronous cell division cycles of the early blastula development, and the lengthening of the cell cycles by the addition of the G1 and G2 phases. Prior to this transition, cleavage occurs with only the synthesis and mitosis phases of the cell cycle. The addition of the two growth phases into the cell cycle allows for the cells to increase in size, as up to this point the blastomeres undergo reductive divisions in which the overall size of the embryo does not increase, but more cells are created. This transition begins the growth in size of the organism.

The mid-blastula transition is also characterized by a marked increase in transcription of new, non-maternal mRNA transcribed from the genome of the organism. Large amounts of the maternal mRNA are destroyed at this point, either by proteins such as SMAUG in Drosophila or by microRNA. These two processes shift the control of the embryo from the maternal mRNA to the nuclei.

== Structure ==
A blastula (blastocyst in mammals), is a sphere of cells surrounding a fluid-filled cavity called the blastocoel. The blastocoel contains amino acids, proteins, growth factors, sugars, ions and other components which are necessary for cellular differentiation. The blastocoel also allows blastomeres to move during the process of gastrulation.

In Xenopus embryos, the blastula is composed of three different regions. These three regions are the ectodermal, mesodermal, and endodermal regions. The animal cap forms the roof of the blastocoel and goes on primarily to form ectodermal derivatives. The equatorial or marginal zone, which compose the walls of the blastocoel differentiate primarily into mesodermal tissue. The vegetal mass is composed of the blastocoel floor and primarily develops into endodermal tissue.

In the mammalian blastocyst there are three lineages that give rise to later tissue development. The epiblast gives rise to the fetus itself while the trophoblast develops into part of the placenta and the primitive endoderm becomes the yolk sac. In the mouse embryo, blastocoel formation begins at the 32-cell stage. During this process, water enters the embryo, aided by an osmotic gradient which is the result of sodium–potassium pumps that produce a high sodium gradient on the basolateral side of the trophectoderm. This movement of water is facilitated by aquaporins. A seal is created by tight junctions of the epithelial cells that line the blastocoel.

=== Cellular adhesion ===
Tight junctions are very important in embryo development. In the blastula, these cadherin mediated cell interactions are essential to development of epithelium which are most important to paracellular transport, maintenance of cell polarity and the creation of a permeability seal to regulate blastocoel formation. These tight junctions arise after the polarity of epithelial cells is established which sets the foundation for further development and specification. Within the blastula, inner blastomeres are generally non-polar while epithelial cells demonstrate polarity.

Mammalian embryos undergo compaction around the 8-cell stage where E-cadherins as well as alpha and beta catenins are expressed. This process makes a ball of embryonic cells which are capable of interacting, rather than a group of diffuse and undifferentiated cells. E-cadherin adhesion defines the apico-basal axis in the developing embryo and turns the embryo from an indistinct ball of cells to a more polarized phenotype which sets the stage for further development into a fully formed blastocyst.

Xenopus membrane polarity is established with the first cell cleavage. Amphibian EP-cadherin and XB/U cadherin perform a similar role as E-cadherin in mammals establishing blastomere polarity and solidifying cell-cell interactions which are crucial for further development.

== Clinical implications ==
=== Fertilization technologies ===
Experiments with implantation in mice show that hormonal induction, superovulation and artificial insemination successfully produce preimplantation mouse embryos. In the mice, ninety percent of the females were induced by mechanical stimulation to undergo pregnancy and implant at least one embryo. These results prove to be encouraging because they provide a basis for potential implantation in other mammalian species, such as humans.

=== Stem cells ===
Blastula-stage cells can behave as pluripotent stem cells in many species. Pluripotent stem cells are the starting point to produce organ specific cells that can potentially aid in repair and prevention of injury and degeneration. Combining the expression of transcription factors and locational positioning of the blastula cells can lead to the development of induced functional organs and tissues. Pluripotent Xenopus cells, when used in an in vivo strategy, were able to form into functional retinas. By transplanting them to the eye field on the neural plate, and by inducing several mis-expressions of transcription factors, the cells were committed to the retinal lineage and could guide vision based behavior in the Xenopus.

== See also ==
- Polarity in embryogenesis
- Diploblasty
- Triploblasty

== Bibliography ==
- Forgács, G. & Newman, Stuart A. (2005). "Cleavage and blastula formation". Biological physics of the developing embryo. Cambridge University Press. ISBN 978-0-521-78337-8.
- Cullen, K.E. (2009). "embryology and early animal development". Encyclopedia of life science, Volume 2. Infobase. ISBN 978-0-8160-7008-4.
- McGeady, Thomas A., ed. (2006). "Gastrulation". Veterinary embryology. Wiley-Blackwell. ISBN 978-1-4051-1147-8.
