= Oligochaetocystinae =

Scientific classification
- Domain: Eukaryota
- Clade: Sar
- Superphylum: Alveolata
- Phylum: Apicomplexa
- Class: Conoidasida
- Order: Eugregarinorida
- Family: Monocystidae
- Subfamily: Oligochaetocystinae; Meier, 1956

Genera
- See text

Subfamily of single-celled organisms

Oligochaetocystinae is a subfamily of parasites in the phylum Apicomplexa.

== Taxonomy ==
There are four genera in this subfamily:

- Acarogregarina
- Echiurocystis
- Neomonocystis
- Oligochaetocystis

== Description ==
The oocysts are cylindrical without thickening at ends.
