= Rhynchocystinae =

Scientific classification
- Domain: Eukaryota
- Clade: Sar
- Clade: Alveolata
- Phylum: Apicomplexa
- Class: Conoidasida
- Order: Eugregarinorida
- Family: Monocystidae
- Subfamily: Rhynchocystinae; Bhatia, 1939

Genera
- Dirhynchocystis; Grayallia; Rhynchocystis

Subfamily of single-celled organisms

The Rhynchocystinae are a subfamily of parasites in the phylum Apicomplexa.

== Taxonomy ==
There are three genera in this subfamily: Dirhynchocystis, Grayallia and Rhynchocystis.

== History ==
This subfamily was described by Bhatia and Stena in 1939.
