= Monocystinae =

Scientific classification
- Domain: Eukaryota
- Clade: Sar
- Superphylum: Alveolata
- Phylum: Apicomplexa
- Class: Conoidasida
- Order: Eugregarinorida
- Family: Monocystidae
- Subfamily: Monocystinae; Bütschli, 1882

Genera
- Apolocystis; Cephalocystis; Mastocystis; Monocystis; Nematocystis; Rhabdocystis; Trigonepimerus

Subfamily of single-celled organisms

The Monocystinae are a subfamily of parasitic alveolates in the phylum Apicomplexa.

== Taxonomy ==
There are seven genera in this subfamily.

The type genus is Monocystis.

== History ==
This subfamily was created by Bütschli in 1882 and modified by Bhatia in 1930.

== Description ==
The species in this subfamily are cylindroid in shape with a mucron at the anterior end.

The trophozoites are solitary.

Syzygy occurs late in the life cycle.

They parasitise the coelom of earthworms and are spread by the orofaecal route.
