= Stomatophorinae =

Scientific classification
- Domain: Eukaryota
- Clade: Sar
- Superphylum: Alveolata
- Phylum: Apicomplexa
- Class: Conoidasida
- Order: Eugregarinorida
- Family: Monocystidae
- Subfamily: Stomatophorinae; Bhatia, 1930

Genera
- Albertisella; Arborocystis; Astrocystella; Beccaricystis; Chakravartiella; Choanocystoides; Craterocystis; Parachoanocystoides; Stomatophora; Zeylanocystis

Subfamily of single-celled organisms

The Stomatophorinae are a subfamily of parasites in the phylum Apicomplexa.

== Taxonomy ==
There are ten genera in this subfamily: Albertisella, Arborocystis, Astrocystella, Beccaricystis, Chakravartiella, Choanocystoides, Craterocystis, Parachoanocystoides, Stomatophora and Zeylanocystis.

== History ==
This subfamily was described by Bhatia in 1930.
