= Monocystidae =

Scientific classification
- Domain: Eukaryota
- Clade: Sar
- Superphylum: Alveolata
- Phylum: Apicomplexa
- Class: Conoidasida
- Order: Eugregarinorida
- Suborder: Aseptatorina
- Family: Monocystidae; Bütschli, 1882

Subfamilies
- Monocystinae; Oligochaetocystinae; Rhynchocystinae; Stomatophorinae; Zygocystinae

Family of single-celled organisms

Monocystidae is a family of parasitic alveolates in the phylum Apicomplexa.

== Taxonomy ==
There are five subfamilies in this family: Monocystinae, Oligochaetocystinae, Rhynchocystinae, Stomatophorinae and Zygocystinae.

== History ==
This family was described by Bütschli in 1882.

== Description ==
The hosts of the species in this family are usually oligochaetes.

The species in this family generally infect the coelom of their hosts.

The gamonts are spherical to cylindrical. The anterior end is little differentiated if at all.

The oocysts are biconical or boat-shaped.
