= Midblastula =

Process in developmental biology

In developmental biology, midblastula or midblastula transition (MBT) occurs during the blastula stage of embryonic development in non-mammals. During this stage, the embryo is referred to as a blastula. The series of changes to the blastula that characterize the midblastula transition include activation of zygotic gene transcription, slowing of the cell cycle, increased asynchrony in cell division, and an increase in cell motility.

== Blastula before MBT ==
This is an embryo 4 hours after fertilization before it has undergone MBT. 3 layers are present: yolk syncytial layer (YSL), enveloping layer (EVL), and deep cells (DEL).

Before the embryo undergoes the midblastula transition it is in a state of fast and constant replication of cells. The cell cycle is very short. The cells in the zygote are also replicating synchronously, always undergoing cell division at the same time. The zygote is not producing its own mRNA but rather it is using mRNAs that were produced in the mother and loaded into the oocyte in order to produce proteins necessary for zygotic growth. The zygotic DNA (genetic material) is not being used because it is repressed through a variety of mechanisms such as methylation. This repressed DNA is sometimes referred to as heterochromatin and is tightly packed together inside the cell because it is not being used for transcription.

== Characteristics of the MBT ==
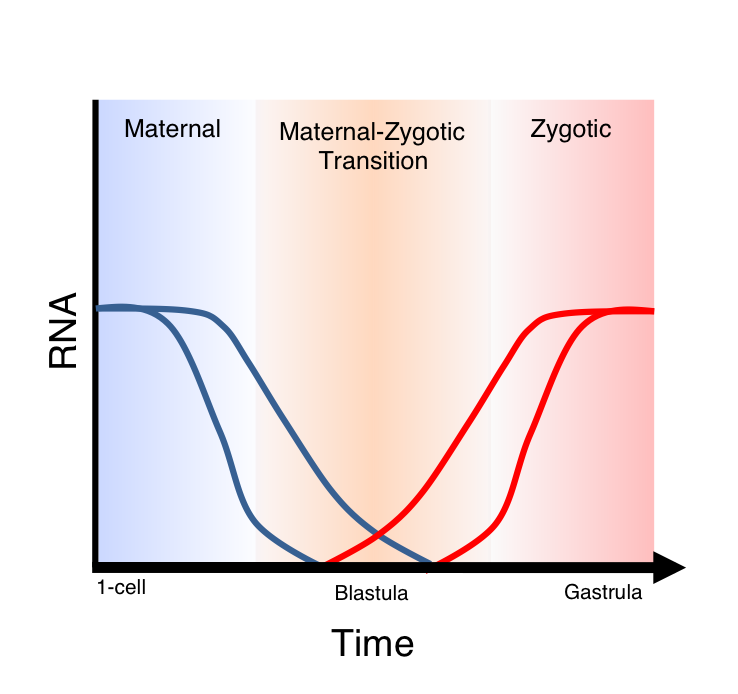
Maternal-zygotic-transition. Changes in RNA over time as the embryo goes through changes in structure from the 1 cell stage to the gastrula stage. The drop in maternal RNA concentration shows the midblastula transition. Blue line represents maternal mRNA and red line represents zygotic mRNA.

Before the zygote undergoes the midblastula transition it is in a state of fast and constant replication of cells.

Cell Cycle with G1 and G2 phases. Orange circle shows what the cell cycle looks like before the MBT. The multi-colored inside circle shows what the cell cycle looks like after MBT and the addition of G1 and G2 phases.

=== Activation of zygotic gene transcription ===
At this stage, the zygote starts producing its own mRNAs that are made from its own DNA, and no longer uses the maternal mRNA. This can also be called the maternal to zygotic transition. The maternal mRNAs are then degraded. Since the cells are now transcribing their own DNA, this stage is where expression of paternal genes is first observed.

=== Cell cycle changes ===
When the zygote begins to produce its own mRNA, the cell cycle begins to slow down and the G1 and G2 phases are added to the cell cycle. The addition of these phases allows the cell to have more time to proofread the new genetic material it is making to ensure there are no mutations. The asynchronous nature of the cell divisions is an important change that occurs during/after the MBT.

== Timing of MBT ==
The timing of MBT varies between different organisms. Zebrafish MBT occurs at cycle 10, but it occurs at cycle 13 in both Xenopus and Drosophila. Cells are thought to time the MBT by measuring the nucleocytoplasmic ratio, which is the ratio between the volume of the nucleus, which contains DNA, to the volume of cytosol. Evidence for this hypothesis comes from experiments showing that the timing of MBT can be sped up by adding extra DNA to make the nucleus larger, or by halving the amount of cytoplasm. The exact methods by which the cell achieves this control is unknown, but it is thought to involve proteins in the cytosol.

In Drosophila, the zinc-finger transcription factor Zelda is bound to regulatory regions of genes expressed by the zygote, and in zebrafish, the homeodomain protein Pou5f3 (a paralog of mammalian POU5F1 (OCT4) has an analogous role. Without the function of these proteins MBT gene expression synchrony is disrupted, but particular mechanisms of coordinating the timing of gene expression are still unknown but being studied.
