= Blastodisc =

Embryo forming part of yolk

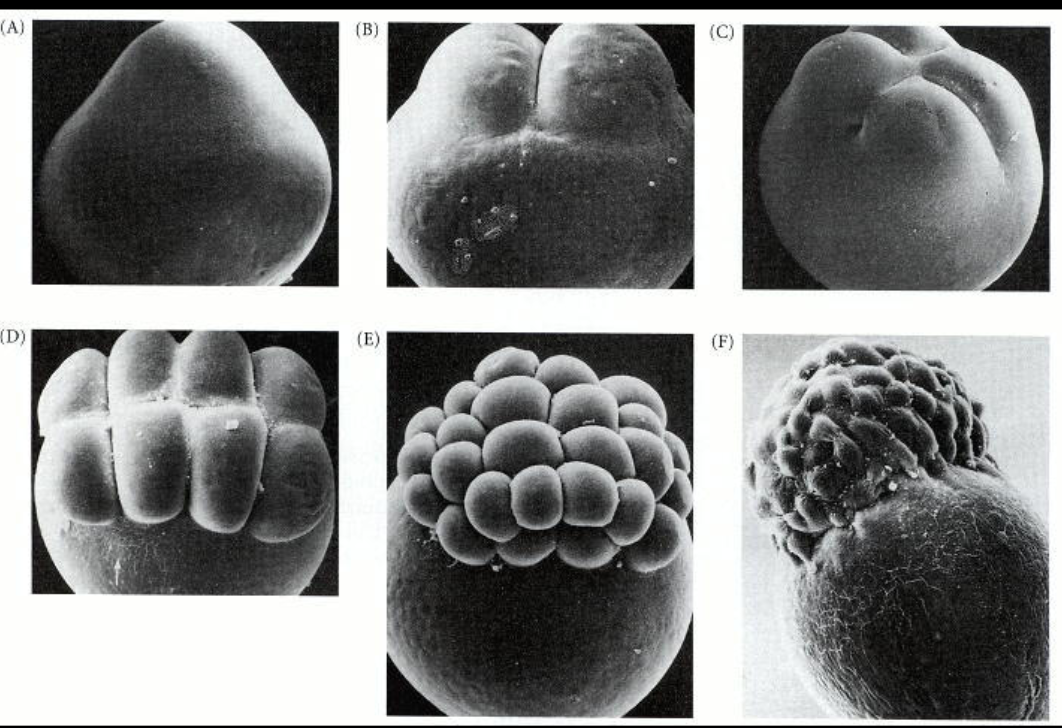
Embryo of Zebrafish undergoing cleavage

The blastodisc, also called the germinal disc, is the embryo-forming part on the yolk of the egg of an animal that undergoes discoidal meroblastic cleavage. Discoidal cleavage occurs in those animals with a large proportion of yolk in their eggs, and include insects, fish, reptiles and birds. The blastodisc is a small disc of cytoplasm that sits on top of the yolk. In birds, it is a small, circular, white spot (approximately 1.5-3 mm across) on the surface of the yellow yolk of an egg, at the animal pole.
