= Blastocyst =

Structure formed around day 5 of mammalian embryonic development

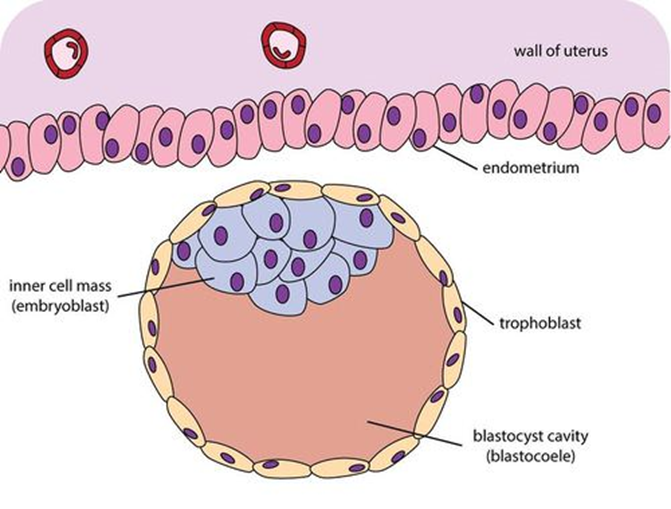
- Blastocyst just before implantation

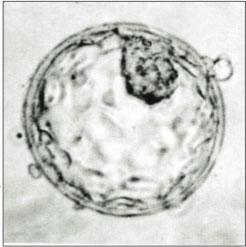
- A human blastocyst, with inner cell mass at upper right

Details
- Carnegie stage: 3
- Days: 5–9
- Gives rise to: Gastrula

Identifiers
- Latin: blastocystis
- MeSH: D001755
- TE: E2.0.1.2.0.0.12
- FMA: 83041

The blastocyst is formed in the early embryonic development of mammals. It possesses an inner cell mass (ICM) also known as the embryoblast which subsequently forms the embryo, and an outer layer of epithelial cells called the trophectoderm. This layer surrounding the inner cell mass is responsible for the formation of the fluid-filled cavity or lumen known as the blastocoel.

In the late blastocyst, the trophectoderm changes to trophoblast. The trophoblast gives rise to the chorion and amnion, the two fetal membranes that surround the embryo. The placenta derives from the embryonic chorion (the portion of the chorion that develops villi). The corresponding structure in non-mammalian animals is an undifferentiated ball of cells called the blastula.

In humans, blastocyst formation begins about five days after fertilization when a fluid-filled cavity opens up in the morula, the early embryonic stage of a ball of 16 cells. The blastocyst has a diameter of about 0.1–0.2 mm and comprises 100-200 cells following 7-8 rounds of cleavage (cell division without cell growth). About seven days after fertilization, the blastocyst undergoes implantation, embedding into the endometrium of the uterine wall where it will undergo further developmental processes, including gastrulation. Embedding of the blastocyst into the endometrium requires that it hatches from the zona pellucida, the egg coat that prevents adherence to the fallopian tube as the pre-embryo makes its way to the uterus.

The use of blastocysts in in vitro fertilization (IVF) involves culturing a fertilized egg for five days before transferring it into the uterus. It can be a more viable method of fertility treatment than traditional IVF. The inner cell mass of blastocysts is the source of embryonic stem cells, which are broadly applicable in stem cell therapies including cell repair, replacement and regeneration. Assisted zona hatching may also be used in IVF and other fertility treatments.

The name "blastocyst" arises from the Greek βλαστός blastós ("a sprout") and κύστις kýstis ("bladder, capsule").

== Development cycle ==
The blastocyst stage occurs between 5 and 9 days after conception. During embryonic development, after fertilization (approximately 5–6 days in the human), the cells of the morula begin to undergo cell differentiation, and the morula changes into the blastocyst by pumping fluid to grow a lumen. In the uterus the zona pellucida surrounding the blastocyst breaks down, allowing it to implant into the uterine wall. Implantation marks the end of the germinal stage of embryogenesis, and the beginning of gestation.

=== Blastocyst formation ===
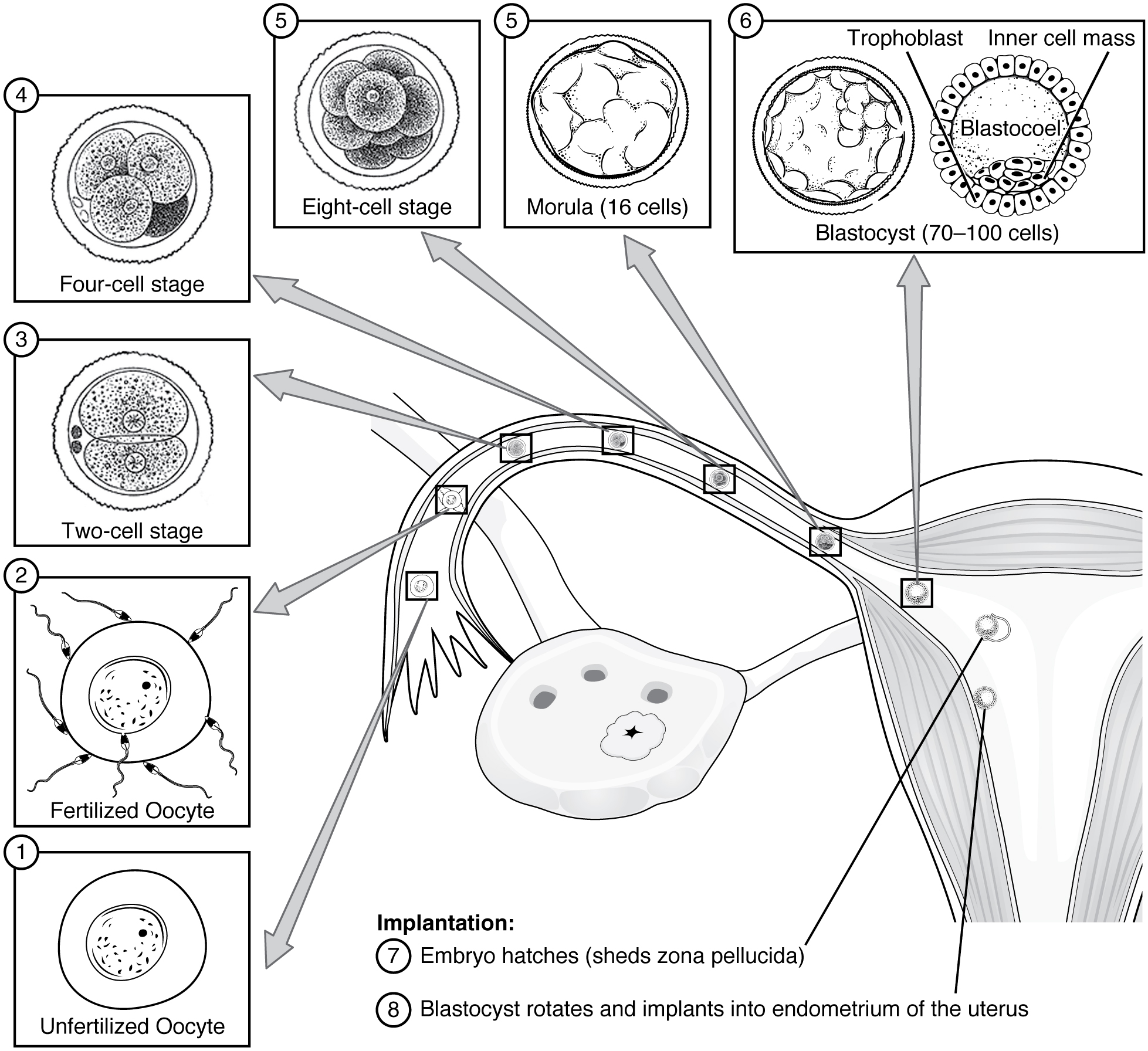
Early development of the human embryo from ovulation through implantation

The zygote undergoes several rounds of mitosis. After the third cleavage division, the embryo begins the process of compaction, which, in humans, is only completed when the embryo consists of 8-16 cells, then becoming known as the morula. Compaction results from increased contractility of the actomyosin cortex, which pull cells together into a tighter configuration. Increased contractility during compaction is observed in both mouse and human embryos, but is stronger in humans, which could contribute to its fragmentation. Until this developmental stage, cells (blastomeres) were not specified to any particular cell lineage but, when reaching the 16-cell stage, cells at the surface of the embryo begin to differentiate into trophectoderm while cells with inner position initiate their differentiation into inner cell mass fate. The morula then develops by cavitation to become the blastocyst, or in many other animals the blastula. Cell differentiation then further commits the morula's cells into two types: trophectoderm cells that surround the lumen and the inner mass of cells (the embryoblast). The inner cell mass is at the origin of embryonic stem cells. The conceptus is then known as the blastocyst.

Before cell differentiation takes place there are two transcription factors, Oct-4 and nanog that are uniformly expressed in all cells, but both of these transcription factors are turned off in the trophoblast once it has formed. The outer cells of the trophectoderm pump sodium ions into the blastocyst, which causes water to enter through osmosis. Water accumulation between cell-cell contacts breaks them open via hydraulic fracturing. The fluid then collects into a single lumen in a process akin to Ostwald ripening to form the blastocoel, which determines the first axis of symmetry of the mammalian embryo. The side of the blastocyst where the inner cell mass forms is called the embryonic pole, and the opposite side is the abembryonic pole. The blastocoel, trophectoderm, and inner cell mass are hallmarks of the blastocyst.

=== Implantation ===
Implantation is critical to the survival and development of the early human embryo. It establishes a connection between the mother and the early embryo which will continue through the remainder of the pregnancy. Implantation is made possible through structural changes in both the blastocyst and endometrial wall. The zona pellucida surrounding the blastocyst breaches, referred to as hatching. This removes the constraint on the physical size of the embryonic mass and exposes the outer cells of the blastocyst to the interior of the uterus. Furthermore, hormonal changes in the mother, specifically a peak in luteinizing hormone (LH), prepare the endometrium to receive and envelop the blastocyst. The immune system is also modulated to allow for the invasion of the foreign embryonic cells. Once bound to the extracellular matrix of the endometrium, trophoblast cells secrete enzymes and other factors to embed the blastocyst into the uterine wall. The enzymes released degrade the endometrial lining, while autocrine growth factors such as human chorionic gonadotropin (hCG) and insulin-like growth factor (IGF) allow the blastocyst to further invade the endometrium.

Implantation in the uterine wall allows for the next step in embryogenesis, gastrulation, which includes the formation of the placenta from trophoblastic cells and differentiation of the inner cell mass into the amniotic sac and epiblast.

== Structure ==
There are two types of blastomere cells:

- The inner cell mass, also known as the embryoblast, gives rise to the primitive endoderm and the embryo proper (epiblast).
  - The primitive endoderm develops into the amniotic sac which forms the fluid-filled cavity that the embryo resides in during pregnancy.
  - The epiblast gives rise to the three germ layers of the developing embryo during gastrulation (endoderm, mesoderm, and ectoderm).
- The trophoblast is a layer of cells forming the outer ring of the blastocyst that combines with the maternal endometrium to form the placenta. Trophoblast cells also secrete factors to make the blastocoel.
  - After implantation, cytotrophoblast is the inner layer of the trophoblast, composed of stem cells which give rise to cells comprising the chorionic villi, placenta, and syncytiotrophoblast.
  - After implantation, syncytiotrophoblast is the outermost layer of the trophoblast. These cells secrete proteolytic enzymes to break down the endometrial extracellular matrix to allow for implantation of the blastocyst in the uterine wall.

The blastocoel fluid cavity contains amino acids, growth factors, and other molecules necessary for cellular differentiation.

=== Cell specification ===
Multiple processes control cell lineage specification in the blastocyst to produce the trophoblast, epiblast, and primitive endoderm. These processes include gene expression, cell signaling, cell-cell contact and positional relationships, and epigenetics.

Once the inner cell mass has been established within the blastocyst, it prepares for further specification into the epiblast and primitive endoderm. This process of specification known as cell fate determination is carried out in part by fibroblast growth factor (FGF) signaling which generates a MAP kinase pathway to alter cellular genomes. Further segregation of blastomeres into the trophectoderm and inner cell mass are regulated by the homeodomain protein, Cdx2. This transcription factor represses the expression of Oct4 and Nanog transcription factors in the trophoblast. These genomic alterations allow for the progressive specification of both epiblast and primitive endoderm lineages at the end of the blastocyst phase of development preceding gastrulation. Much of the research conducted on these early embryonic stages is on mouse embryos and specific factors may differ between mammals.

During implantation, the trophoblast gives rise to extraembryonic membranes and cell types that will eventually form most of the fetal placenta, the specialized organ through which the embryo obtains maternal nourishment necessary for subsequent exponential growth. The specification of the trophoblast is controlled by the combination of morphological cues arising from cell polarity with differential activity of signaling pathways such as Hippo and Notch, and the restriction to outer cells of lineage specifiers such as CDX2.

In the mouse, primordial germ cells are specified from epiblast cells, a process that is accompanied by extensive genome-wide epigenetic reprogramming. Reprogramming involves global DNA demethylation and chromatin reorganization resulting in cellular totipotency. The process of genome-wide demethylation involves the DNA base excision repair pathway.

Trophoblasts express integrin on their cell surfaces which allow for adhesion to the extracellular matrix of the uterine wall. This interaction allows for implantation and triggers further specification into the three different cell types, preparing the blastocyst for gastrulation.

== Clinical implications ==
=== Pregnancy tests ===
The level of human chorionic gonadotropin (hCG) secreted by the blastocyst during implantation is the factor measured in a pregnancy test. hCG can be measured in both blood and urine to determine whether a woman is pregnant. More hCG is secreted in a multiple pregnancy. Blood tests of hCG can also be used to check for abnormal pregnancies.

=== In vitro fertilization ===
In vitro fertilization (IVF) is an alternative to traditional in vivo fertilization for fertilizing an egg with sperm and implanting that embryo into a female's womb (uterus). For many years the embryo was inserted into the uterus two to three days after fertilization. However at this stage of development it is very difficult to predict which embryos will develop best, and several embryos were typically implanted. Several implanted embryos increased the likelihood of a developing fetus but also led to the development of multiple fetuses. This was a major problem and drawback for using embryos in IVF.

The use of blastocysts for human IVF has proved successful. A blastocyst is implanted five to six days after the eggs have been fertilized. After five or six days it is much easier to determine which embryos will result in healthy live births. Knowing which embryos will succeed allows just one blastocyst to be implanted, cutting down dramatically on the health risk and expense of multiple births. Now that the nutrient requirements for embryonic and blastocyst development have been determined, it is much easier to give embryos the correct nutrients to sustain them into the blastocyst phase.

Embryo transfer following in vitro fertilization is a procedure in which a catheter is inserted into the vagina, guided through the cervix via ultrasound, and into the uterine cavity where the blastocysts are inserted into the womb.

Blastocysts also offer an advantage because they can be used to genetically test the cells to check for genetic problems. There are enough cells in a blastocyst that a few trophectoderm cells can be removed without disturbing the developing blastocyst. These cells can be tested for chromosome aneuploidy using preimplantation genetic screening (PGS), or specific conditions such as cystic fibrosis, often known as preimplantation genetic diagnosis (PGD).

=== Embryo transfer process ===
In an embryo transfer procedure following an initial ultrasound, a speculum is used to open the walls of the vagina, and using a catheter an embryo is passed through the tube for placement into the womb.

== See also ==
- Developmental biology
