= Embryo =

Multicellular diploid eukaryote in its earliest stage of development

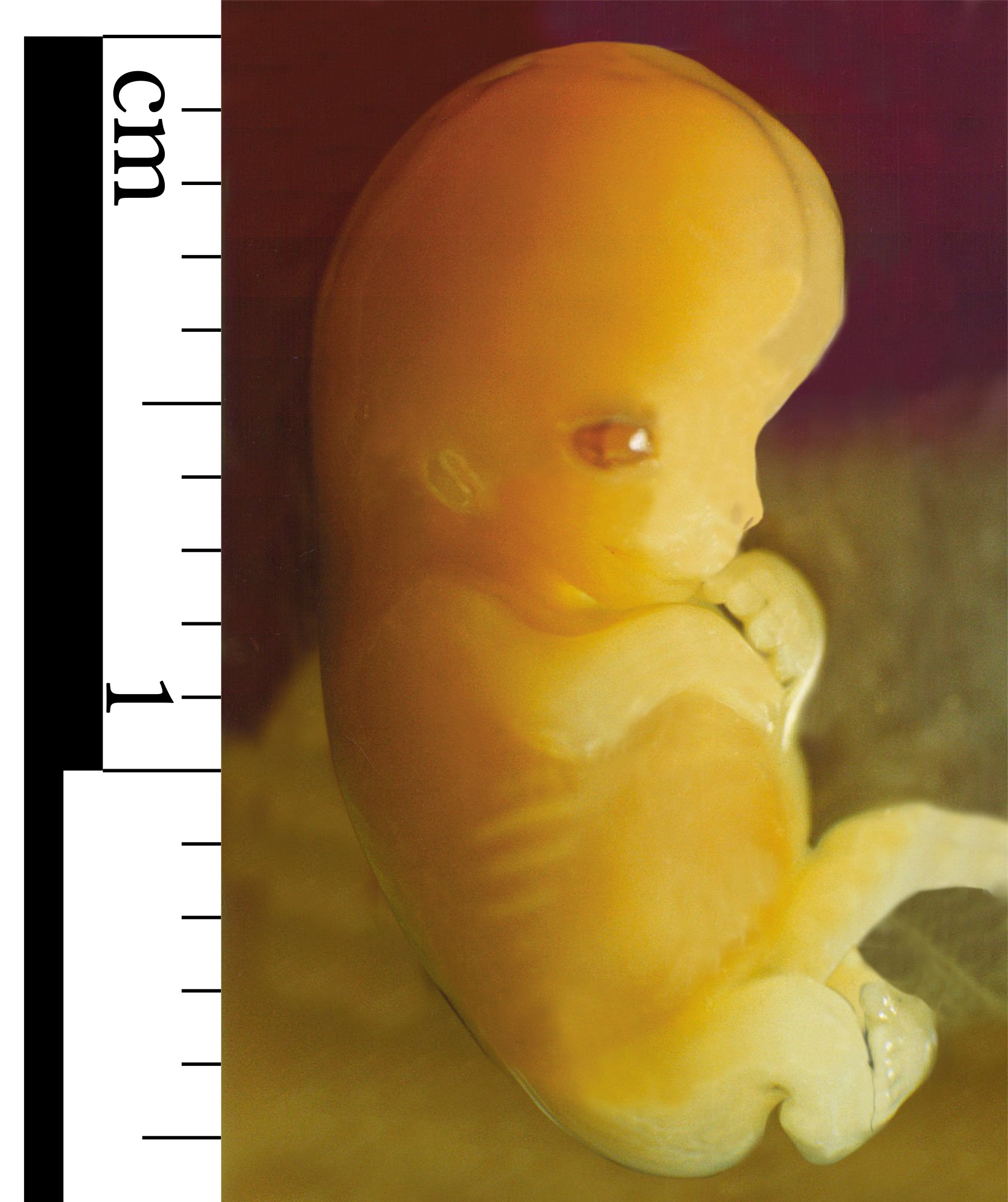
- A human embryo seven weeks after conception (nine weeks gestational age)

An embryo (/ˈɛmbrioʊ/ EM-bree-oh) is the initial stage of development for a multicellular organism. In organisms that reproduce sexually, embryonic development is the part of the life cycle that begins just after fertilization of the female egg cell by the male sperm cell. The resulting fusion of these two cells produces a single-celled zygote that undergoes many cell divisions that produce cells known as blastomeres. The blastomeres are arranged as a solid ball that when reaching a certain size, called a morula, takes in fluid to create a cavity called a blastocoel. The structure is then termed a blastula, or a blastocyst in mammals.

The mammalian blastocyst hatches before implantating into the endometrial lining of the womb. Once implanted the embryo will continue its development through the next stages of gastrulation, neurulation, and organogenesis. Gastrulation, possibly induced in part by paracrine signalling from the amnion, is the formation of the three germ layers that will form all of the different parts of the body. Neurulation forms the nervous system, and organogenesis is the development of all the various tissues and organs of the body.

A newly developing human is typically referred to as an embryo until the ninth week after conception, when it is then referred to as a fetus. In other multicellular organisms, the word embryo can be used more broadly to any early developmental or life cycle stage prior to birth or hatching.

== Etymology ==
First attested in English in the mid-14th century, the word embryon derives from Medieval Latin embryo, itself from Greek ἔμβρυον (émbryon) 'young one', which is the neuter form of ἔμβρυος (émbryos) 'growing in'. Morphologically it is derived from ἐν (en) 'in' and βρύω (brýō) 'to swell, to be full'. The proper Latinized form of the Greek term would be embryum.

== Development ==
=== Animal embryos ===
Embryonic development of salamander, circa the 1920s

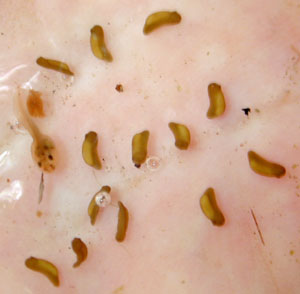
Embryos (and one tadpole) of the wrinkled frog (Rana rugosa)

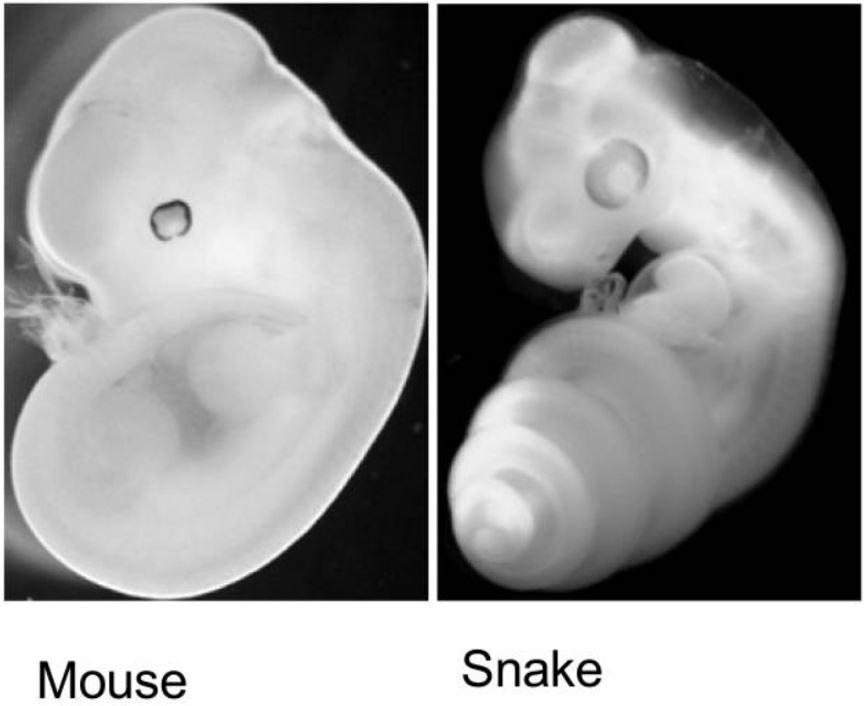
Mouse and snake embryos

In animals, fertilization begins the process of embryonic development with the creation of a zygote, a single cell resulting from the fusion of gametes (e.g. egg and sperm). The development of a zygote into a multicellular embryo proceeds through a series of recognizable stages, often divided into cleavage, blastula, gastrulation, and organogenesis.

Cleavage is the period of rapid mitotic cell divisions that occur after fertilization. During cleavage, the overall size of the embryo does not change, but the size of individual cells decrease rapidly, as they divide to increase the total number of cells. Cleavage results in a blastula.

Depending on the species, a blastula or blastocyst stage embryo can appear as a ball of cells on top of yolk, or as a hollow sphere of cells surrounding a middle cavity. The embryo's cells continue to divide and increase in number, while molecules within the cells such as RNAs and proteins actively promote key developmental processes such as gene expression, cell fate specification, and polarity. Before implanting into the uterine wall the embryo is sometimes known as the pre-implantation embryo or pre-implantation conceptus. Sometimes this is called the pre-embryo, a term employed to differentiate from an embryo proper in relation to embryonic stem cell discourses.

Gastrulation is the next phase of embryonic development, and involves the development of two or more layers of cells (germinal layers). Animals that form two layers (such as Cnidaria) are called diploblastic, and those that form three (most other animals, from flatworms to humans) are called triploblastic. During gastrulation of triploblastic animals, the three germinal layers that form are called the ectoderm, mesoderm, and endoderm. All tissues and organs of a mature animal can trace their origin back to one of these layers. For example, the ectoderm will give rise to the skin epidermis and the nervous system, the mesoderm will give rise to the vascular system, muscles, bone, and connective tissues, and the endoderm will give rise to organs of the digestive system and epithelium of the digestive system and respiratory system. Many visible changes in embryonic structure happen throughout gastrulation as the cells that make up the different germ layers migrate and cause the previously round embryo to fold or invaginate into a cup-like appearance.

Past gastrulation, an embryo continues to develop into a mature multicellular organism by forming structures necessary for life outside of the womb or egg. As the name suggests, organogenesis is the stage of embryonic development when organs form. During organogenesis, molecular and cellular interactions prompt certain populations of cells from the different germ layers to differentiate into organ-specific cell types. For example, in neurogenesis, a subpopulation of cells from the ectoderm segregate from other cells and further specialize to become the brain, spinal cord, or peripheral nerves.

The embryonic period varies from species to species. In human development, the term fetus is used instead of embryo after the ninth week after conception, whereas in zebrafish, embryonic development is considered finished when a bone called the cleithrum becomes visible. In animals that hatch from an egg, such as birds, a young animal is typically no longer referred to as an embryo once it has hatched. In viviparous animals (animals whose offspring spend at least some time developing within a parent's body), the offspring is typically referred to as an embryo while inside of the parent, and is no longer considered an embryo after birth or exit from the parent. However, the extent of development and growth accomplished while inside of an egg or parent varies significantly from species to species, so much so that the processes that take place after hatching or birth in one species may take place well before those events in another. Therefore, according to one textbook, it is common for scientists to interpret the scope of embryology broadly as the study of the development of animals.

=== Plant embryos ===
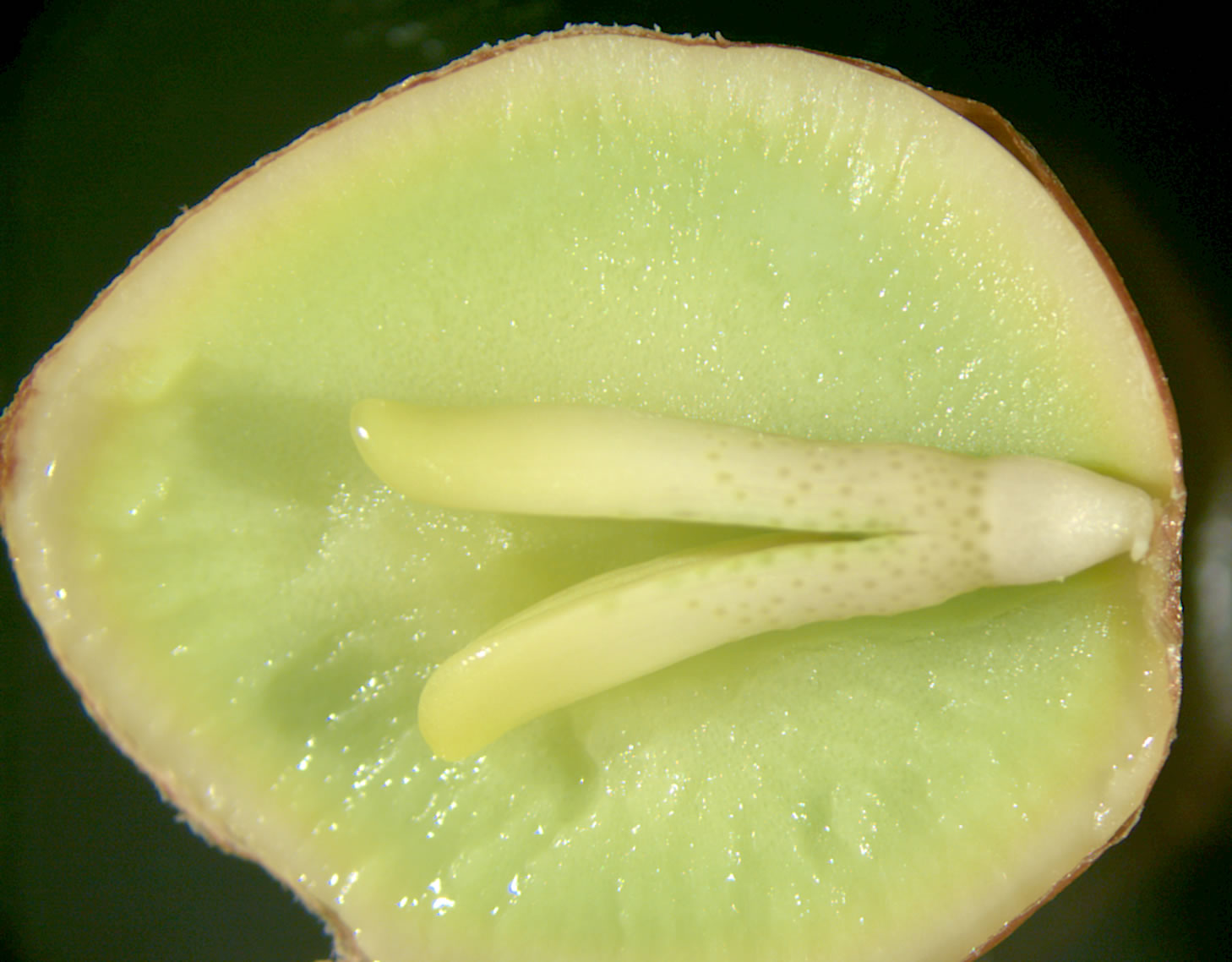
The inside of a Ginkgo seed, showing the embryo

Flowering plants (angiosperms) create embryos after the fertilization of a haploid ovule by pollen. The DNA from the ovule and pollen combine to form a diploid, single-cell zygote that will develop into an embryo. The zygote, which will divide multiple times as it progresses throughout embryonic development, is one part of a seed. Other seed components include the endosperm, which is tissue rich in nutrients that will help support the growing plant embryo, and the seed coat, which is a protective outer covering. The first cell division of a zygote is asymmetric, resulting in an embryo with one small cell (the apical cell) and one large cell (the basal cell). The small, apical cell will eventually give rise to most of the structures of the mature plant, such as the stem, leaves, and roots. The larger basal cell will give rise to the suspensor, which connects the embryo to the endosperm so that nutrients can pass between them. The plant embryo cells continue to divide and progress through developmental stages named for their general appearance: globular, heart, and torpedo. In the globular stage, three basic tissue types (dermal, ground, and vascular) can be recognized. The dermal tissue will give rise to the epidermis or outer covering of a plant, ground tissue will give rise to inner plant material that functions in photosynthesis, resource storage, and physical support, and vascular tissue will give rise to connective tissue like the xylem and phloem that transport fluid, nutrients, and minerals throughout the plant. In heart stage, one or two cotyledons (embryonic leaves) will form. Meristems (centers of stem cell activity) develop during the torpedo stage, and will eventually produce many of the mature tissues of the adult plant throughout its life. At the end of embryonic growth, the seed will usually go dormant until germination. Once the embryo begins to germinate (grow out from the seed) and forms its first true leaf, it is called a seedling or plantlet.

Plants that produce spores instead of seeds, like bryophytes and ferns, also produce embryos. In these plants, the embryo begins its existence attached to the inside of the archegonium on a parental gametophyte from which the egg cell was generated. The inner wall of the archegonium lies in close contact with the "foot" of the developing embryo; this "foot" consists of a bulbous mass of cells at the base of the embryo which may receive nutrition from its parent gametophyte. The structure and development of the rest of the embryo varies by group of plants.

Since all land plants create embryos, they are collectively referred to as embryophytes (or by their scientific name, Embryophyta). This, along with other characteristics, distinguishes land plants from other types of plants, such as algae, which do not produce embryos.

== Research and technology ==
=== Biological processes ===
Embryos from numerous plant and animal species are studied in biological research laboratories across the world to learn about topics such as stem cells, evolution and development, cell division, and gene expression. Examples of scientific discoveries made while studying embryos that were awarded the Nobel Prize in Physiology or Medicine include the Spemann-Mangold organizer, a group of cells originally discovered in amphibian embryos that give rise to neural tissues, and genes that give rise to body segments discovered in Drosophila fly embryos by Christiane Nüsslein-Volhard and Eric Wieschaus.

=== Assisted reproductive technology ===
Creating and/or manipulating embryos via assisted reproductive technology (ART) is used for addressing fertility concerns in humans and other animals, and for selective breeding in agricultural species. Between the years 1987 and 2015, ART techniques including in vitro fertilization (IVF) were responsible for an estimated one million human births in the United States alone. Other clinical technologies include preimplantation genetic diagnosis (PGD), which can identify certain serious genetic abnormalities, such as aneuploidy, prior to selecting embryos for use in IVF. Some have proposed (or even attempted—see He Jiankui affair) genetic editing of human embryos via CRISPR-Cas9 as a potential avenue for preventing disease; however, this has been met with widespread condemnation from the scientific community.

ART techniques are also used to improve the profitability of agricultural animal species such as cows and pigs by enabling selective breeding for desired traits and/or to increase numbers of offspring. For example, when allowed to breed naturally, cows typically produce one calf per year, whereas IVF increases offspring yield to 9–12 calves per year. IVF and other ART techniques, including cloning via interspecies somatic cell nuclear transfer (iSCNT), are also used in attempts to increase the numbers of endangered or vulnerable species, such as Northern white rhinos, cheetahs, and sturgeons.

=== Cryoconservation of plant and animal biodiversity ===
Cryoconservation of genetic resources involves collecting and storing the reproductive materials, such as embryos, seeds, or gametes, from animal or plant species at low temperatures in order to preserve them for future use. Some large-scale animal species cryoconservation efforts include "frozen zoos" in various places around the world, including in the UK's Frozen Ark, the Breeding Centre for Endangered Arabian Wildlife (BCEAW) in the United Arab Emirates, and the San Diego Zoo Institute for Conservation in the United States. As of 2018, there were approximately 1,700 seed banks used to store and protect plant biodiversity, particularly in the event of mass extinction or other global emergencies. The Svalbard Global Seed Vault in Norway maintains the largest collection of plant reproductive tissue, with more than a million samples stored at −18 °C (0 °F).

== Fossilized embryos ==
Fossilized animal embryos are known from the Precambrian, and are found in great numbers during the Cambrian period. Even fossilized dinosaur embryos have been discovered.

== See also ==
- Abortion
- Embryo loss
- In vitro fertilisation
- Miscarriage
- Pre-embryo
- Pregnancy
- Prenatal development

== Notes ==
Preceded by Zygote	Animal development Embryo	Succeeded by Fetus, Hatchling, Larva
