= Cleavage (embryo) =

Division of cells in the early embryo

In embryology, cleavage is the division of cells in the early development of the embryo, following fertilization but before amniogenesis. The zygotes of many species undergo rapid cell cycles with no significant overall growth, producing a cluster of cells the same size as the original zygote. The different cells derived from cleavage are called blastomeres and form a compact mass called the morula. Cleavage ends with the formation of the blastula, or of the blastocyst in mammals.

Depending mostly on the concentration of yolk in the egg, the cleavage can be holoblastic (total or complete cleavage) or meroblastic (partial or incomplete cleavage). The pole of the egg with the highest concentration of yolk is referred to as the vegetal pole while the opposite is referred to as the animal pole.

Cleavage differs from other forms of cell division in that it increases the number of cells and nuclear mass without increasing the cytoplasmic mass. This means that with each successive subdivision, there is roughly half the cytoplasm in each daughter cell than before that division, and thus twice the ratio of nuclear to cytoplasmic material.

== Fundamental laws of cleavage ==
Cleavage mechanisms and types are governed by four general laws, derived from early studies of embryonic development patterns:

- Pfluger's Law: the spindle, once formed, will elongate in the direction where the resistance is least (minimal).
- Balfour's Law: In holoblastic cleavage, the rate at which cleavage progresses tends to reflect the amount of yolk present. Yolk slows down division of both cytoplasm and nucleus.
- Sack's Law: Daughter cells are of equal size; and successive planes of division are at right angles to one another.
- Hertwig's Law: The nucleus (and spindle) tend to locate at the center of the active protoplasm; and the spindle tends to align with the longest dimension (axis) of the cytoplasmic mass. The subsequent division cleaves the mass accordingly. (Thus, the mother cell cleaves across its longest axis, which is then the smallest dimension of the daughter cells. When they subsequently cleave, their spindles will align across that axis: hence Sack's Law).

== Mechanism ==
The rapid cell cycles are facilitated by maintaining high levels of proteins that control cell cycle progression such as the cyclins and their associated cyclin-dependent kinases (CDKs). The complex cyclin B/CDK1 also known as MPF (maturation promoting factor) promotes entry into mitosis.

The processes of karyokinesis (mitosis) and cytokinesis work together to result in cleavage. The mitotic apparatus is made up of a central spindle and polar asters made up of polymers of tubulin protein called microtubules. The asters are nucleated by centrosomes and the centrosomes are organized by centrioles brought into the egg by the sperm as basal bodies. Cytokinesis is mediated by the contractile ring made up of polymers of actin protein called microfilaments. Karyokinesis and cytokinesis are independent but spatially and temporally coordinated processes. While mitosis can occur in the absence of cytokinesis, cytokinesis requires the mitotic apparatus.

The end of cleavage coincides with the beginning of zygotic transcription. This point in non-mammals is referred to as the midblastula transition and appears to be controlled by the nuclear-cytoplasmic ratio (about 1:6).

== Types of cleavage ==
=== Determinate ===
Determinate cleavage (also called mosaic cleavage) is in most protostomes. It results in the developmental fate of the cells being set early in the embryo development. Each blastomere produced by early embryonic cleavage does not have the capacity to develop into a complete embryo.

=== Indeterminate ===
A cell can only be indeterminate (also called regulative) if it has a complete set of undisturbed animal/vegetal cytoarchitectural features. It is characteristic of deuterostomes—when the original cell in a deuterostome embryo divides, the two resulting cells can be separated, and each one can individually develop into a whole organism.

=== Holoblastic ===
In holoblastic cleavage, the zygote and blastomeres are completely divided during the cleavage, so the number of blastomeres doubles with each cleavage. In the absence of a large concentration of yolk, four major cleavage types can be observed in isolecithal cells (cells with a small, even distribution of yolk) or in mesolecithal cells or microlecithal cells (moderate concentration of yolk in a gradient)—bilateral holoblastic, radial holoblastic, rotational holoblastic, and spiral holoblastic, cleavage. These holoblastic cleavage planes pass all the way through isolecithal zygotes during the process of cytokinesis. Coeloblastula is the next stage of development for eggs that undergo these radial cleavages. In holoblastic eggs, the first cleavage always occurs along the vegetal-animal axis of the egg, the second cleavage is perpendicular to the first. From here, the spatial arrangement of blastomeres can follow various patterns, due to different planes of cleavage, in various organisms.

==== Bilateral ====
The first cleavage results in bisection of the zygote into left and right halves. The following cleavage planes are centered on this axis and result in the two halves being mirror images of one another. In bilateral holoblastic cleavage, the divisions of the blastomeres are complete and separate; compared with bilateral meroblastic cleavage, in which the blastomeres stay partially connected.

==== Radial ====
Radial cleavage is characteristic of the deuterostomes, which include vertebrates and echinoderms, in which the spindle axes are parallel or at right angles to the polar axis of the oocyte.

==== Rotational ====
Rotational cleavage involves a normal first division along the meridional axis, giving rise to two daughter cells. The way in which this cleavage differs is that one of the daughter cells divides meridionally, whilst the other divides equatorially.

The nematode C. elegans, a popular developmental model organism, undergoes holoblastic rotational cell cleavage.

==== Spiral ====
Spiral cleavage is conserved between many members of the lophotrochozoan taxa, referred to as Spiralia. Most spiralians undergo equal spiral cleavage, although some undergo unequal cleavage (see below). This group includes annelids, molluscs, and sipuncula. Spiral cleavage can vary between species, but generally the first two cell divisions result in four macromeres, also called blastomeres, (A, B, C, D) each representing one quadrant of the embryo. These first two cleavages are not oriented in planes that occur at right angles parallel to the animal-vegetal axis of the zygote. At the 4-cell stage, the A and C macromeres meet at the animal pole, creating the animal cross-furrow, while the B and D macromeres meet at the vegetal pole, creating the vegetal cross-furrow. With each successive cleavage cycle, the macromeres give rise to quartets of smaller micromeres at the animal pole. The divisions that produce these quartets occur at an oblique angle, an angle that is not a multiple of 90 degrees, to the animal-vegetal axis. Each quartet of micromeres is rotated relative to their parent macromere, and the chirality of this rotation differs between odd- and even-numbered quartets, meaning that there is alternating symmetry between the odd and even quartets. In other words, the orientation of divisions that produces each quartet alternates between being clockwise and counterclockwise with respect to the animal pole. The alternating cleavage pattern that occurs as the quartets are generated produces quartets of micromeres that reside in the cleavage furrows of the four macromeres. When viewed from the animal pole, this arrangement of cells displays a spiral pattern.

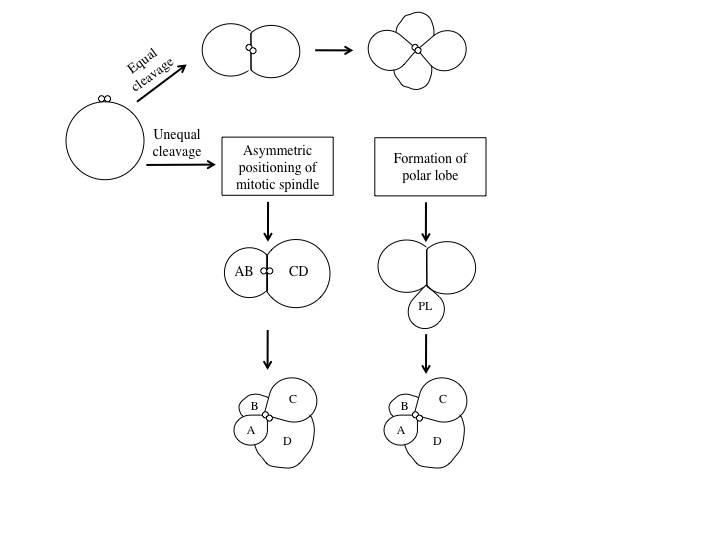
D quadrant specification through equal and unequal cleavage mechanisms. At the 4-cell stage of equal cleavage, the D macromere has not been specified yet. It will be specified after the formation of the third quartet of micromeres. Unequal cleavage occurs in two ways: asymmetric positioning of the mitotic spindle, or through the formation of a polar lobe (PL).

Specification of the D macromere and is an important aspect of spiralian development. Although the primary axis, animal-vegetal, is determined during oogenesis, the secondary axis, dorsal-ventral, is determined by the specification of the D quadrant. The D macromere facilitates cell divisions that differ from those produced by the other three macromeres. Cells of the D quadrant give rise to dorsal and posterior structures of the spiralian. Two known mechanisms exist to specify the D quadrant. These mechanisms include equal cleavage and unequal cleavage.

In equal cleavage, the first two cell divisions produce four macromeres that are indistinguishable from one another. Each macromere has the potential of becoming the D macromere. After the formation of the third quartet, one of the macromeres initiates maximum contact with the overlying micromeres in the animal pole of the embryo. This contact is required to distinguish one macromere as the official D quadrant blastomere. In equally cleaving spiral embryos, the D quadrant is not specified until after the formation of the third quartet, when contact with the micromeres dictates one cell to become the future D blastomere. Once specified, the D blastomere signals to surrounding micromeres to lay out their cell fates.

In unequal cleavage, the first two cell divisions are unequal producing four cells in which one cell is bigger than the other three. This larger cell is specified as the D macromere. Unlike equally cleaving spiralians, the D macromere is specified at the four-cell stage during unequal cleavage. Unequal cleavage can occur in two ways. One method involves asymmetric positioning of the cleavage spindle. This occurs when the aster at one pole attaches to the cell membrane, causing it to be much smaller than the aster at the other pole. This results in an unequal cytokinesis, in which both macromeres inherit part of the animal region of the egg, but only the bigger macromere inherits the vegetal region. The second mechanism of unequal cleavage involves the production of an enucleate, membrane bound, cytoplasmic protrusion, called a polar lobe. This polar lobe forms at the vegetal pole during cleavage, and then gets shunted to the D blastomere. The polar lobe contains vegetal cytoplasm, which becomes inherited by the future D macromere.

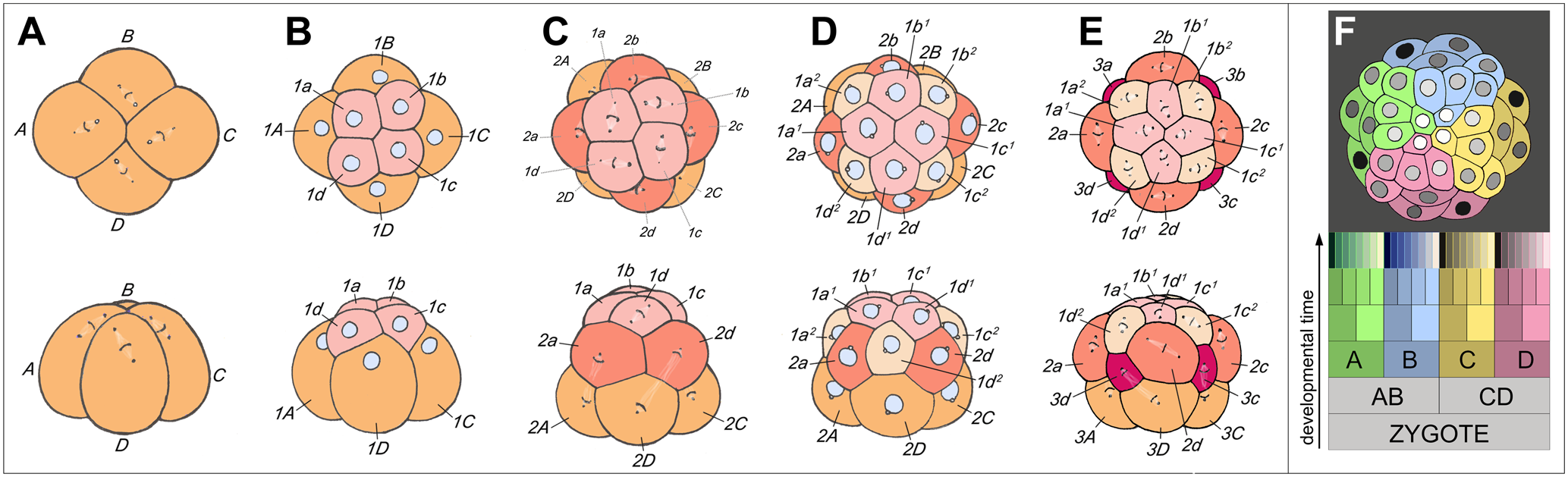
Spiral cleavage in marine snail of the genus Trochus

=== Meroblastic ===
In the presence of a large concentration of yolk in the fertilized egg cell, the cell can undergo partial, or meroblastic, cleavage. Two major types of meroblastic cleavage are discoidal and superficial.

- Discoidal

In discoidal cleavage, the cleavage furrows do not penetrate the yolk. The embryo forms a disc of cells, called a blasto-disc, on top of the yolk. Discoidal cleavage is commonly found in monotremes, birds, reptiles, and fish that have telolecithal egg cells (egg cells with the yolk concentrated at one end). The layer of cells that have incompletely divided and are in contact with the yolk are called the "syncytial layer".

- Superficial

In superficial cleavage, mitosis occurs but not cytokinesis, resulting in a polynuclear cell. With the yolk positioned in the center of the egg cell, the nuclei migrate to the periphery of the egg, and the plasma membrane grows inward, partitioning the nuclei into individual cells. Superficial cleavage occurs in arthropods that have centrolecithal egg cells (egg cells with the yolk located in the center of the cell). This type of cleavage can work to promote synchronicity in developmental timing, such as in Drosophila.

Summary of the main patterns of cleavage and yolk accumulation (after ,, and).
I. Holoblastic (complete) cleavage	II. Meroblastic (incomplete) cleavage
A. Isolecithal (sparse, evenly distributed yolk): 1. Radial cleavage (echinoderms, hemichordates, amphioxus); 2. Spiral cleavage (annelids, most mollusks, flatworms); 3. Bilateral cleavage (tunicates); 4. Rotational cleavage (placental mammals, nematodes, marsupials [?]); B. Mesolecithal (moderate vegetal yolk disposition): Displaced radial cleavage (amphibians, some fish [the lampreys, gars and bowfins])	A. Telolecithal (dense yolk throughout most of cell): 1. Bilateral cleavage (cephalopod molluscs); 2. Discoidal cleavage (some fish [the hagfishes, chondrichthyans and most teleosts], sauropsids [reptiles and birds], monotremes); B. Centrolecithal (yolk in center of egg): Superficial cleavage (most insects)

== Mammals ==
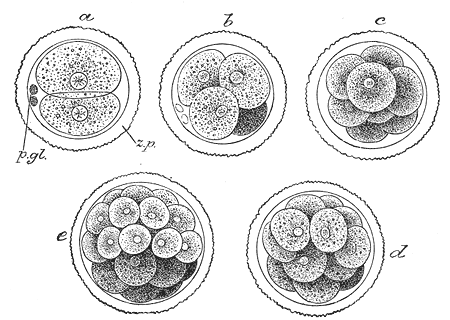
First stages of cleavage in a fertilized mammalian egg. Semidiagrammatic. z.p. Zona pellucida. p.gl. Polar bodies a. Two-cell stage b. Four-cell stage c. Eight-cell stage d, e. Morula stage

Compared to other fast developing animals, mammals have a slower rate of division that is between 12 and 24 hours. Initially synchronous, these cellular divisions progressively become more and more asynchronous. Zygotic transcription starts at the two-, four-, or eight-cell stage depending on the species (for example, mouse zygotic transcription begins towards the end of the zygote stage and becomes significant at the two-cell stage, whereas human embryos begin zygotic transcription at the eight-cell stage). Cleavage is holoblastic and rotational.

In human embryonic development at the eight-cell stage, having undergone three cleavages the embryo starts to change shape as it develops into a morula and then a blastocyst. At the eight-cell stage the blastomeres are initially round, and only loosely adhered. With further division in the process of compaction the cells flatten onto one another. At the 16–cell stage the compacted embryo is called a morula. At this stage, the embryo begins to resemble a mulberry, hence the name morula (from Latin morus 'mulberry'). Concomitantly, they develop an inside-out polarity that provides distinct characteristics and functions to their cell-cell and cell-medium interfaces. As surface cells become epithelial, they begin to tightly adhere as gap junctions are formed, and tight junctions are developed with the other blastomeres. With further compaction the individual outer blastomeres, of the trophectoderm, become indistinguishable as they become organised into a thin sheet of tightly adhered epithelial cells. They are still enclosed within the zona pellucida. The morula is now watertight, to contain the fluid that the cells will later pump into the embryo to transform it into the blastocyst.

In humans, the morula enters the uterus after three or four days, and begins to take in fluid, as sodium-potassium pumps on the trophoblasts pump sodium into the morula, drawing in water by osmosis from the maternal environment to become blastocoelic fluid. As a consequence to increased osmotic pressure, the accumulation of fluid raises the hydrostatic pressure inside the embryo. Hydrostatic pressure breaks open cell-cell contacts within the embryo by hydraulic fracturing. Initially dispersed in hundreds of water pockets throughout the embryo, the fluid collects into a single large cavity, called blastocoel, following a process akin to Ostwald ripening. Embryoblast cells also known as the inner cell mass form a compact mass of cells at the embryonic pole on one side of the cavity that will go on to produce the embryo proper. The embryo is now termed a blastocyst. The trophoblasts will eventually give rise to the embryonic contribution to the placenta called the chorion.

A single cell can be removed from a pre-compaction eight-cell embryo and used for genetic screening, and the embryo will recover.

Differences exist between cleavage in placental mammals and other mammals.
