= Zygote =

Diploid eukaryotic cell formed by fertilization between two gametes

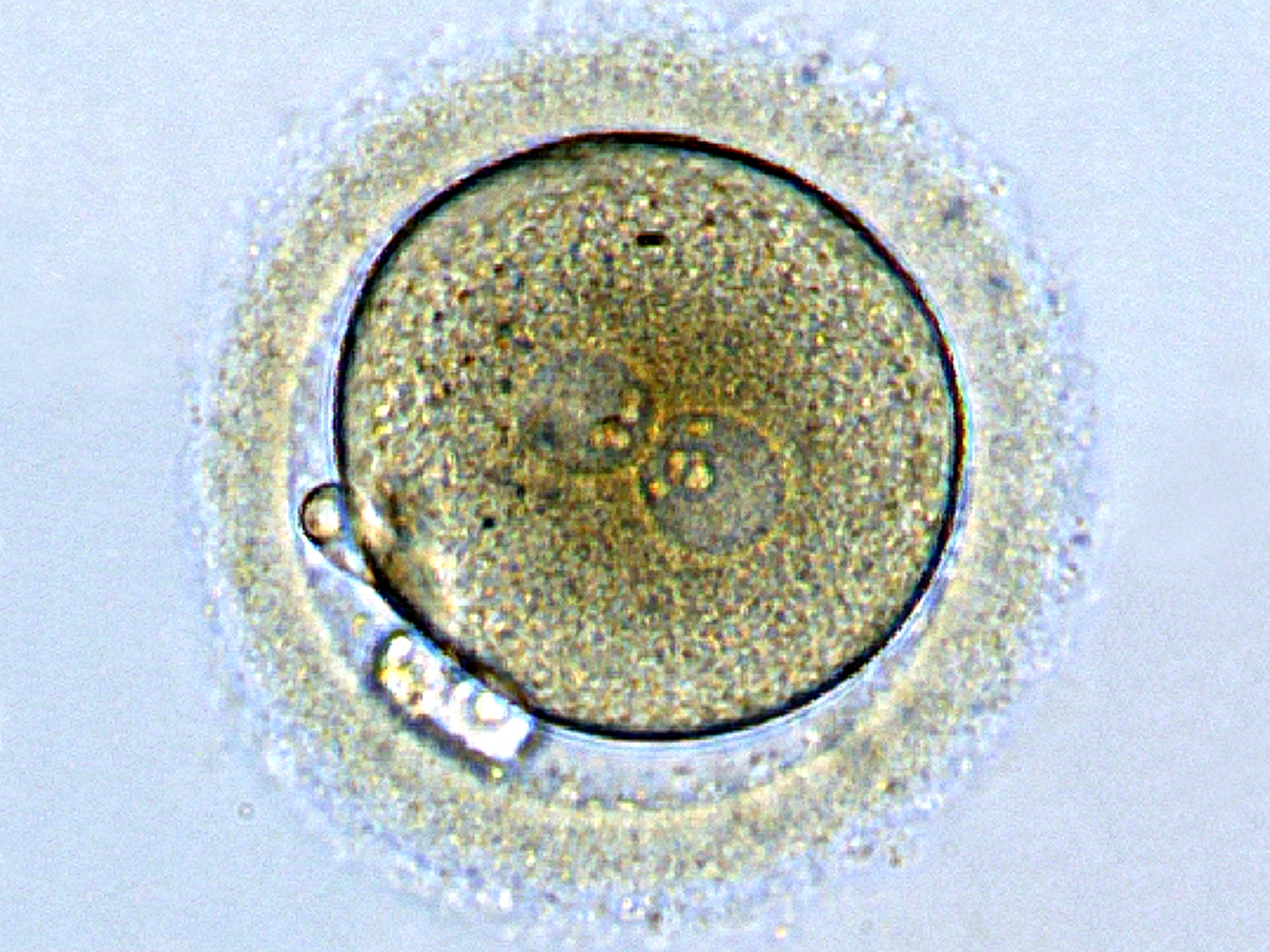
- Zygote formation: egg cell after fertilization with a sperm. The male and female pronuclei are converging, but the genetic material is not yet united.

Details
- Precursor: Gametes
- Gives rise to: Blastomeres

Identifiers
- MeSH: D015053
- TE: E2.0.1.2.0.0.9
- FMA: 72395

A zygote (/ˈzaɪˌɡoʊt/ from Ancient Greek ζυγωτός (zygōtós) 'joined, yoked', from ζυγοῦν (zygoun) 'to join, to yoke') is a eukaryotic cell formed by a fertilization event between two gametes.

The zygote's genome is a combination of the DNA in each gamete, and contains all of the genetic information of a new individual organism.

The sexual fusion of haploid cells is called karyogamy, the result of which is the formation of a diploid cell called the zygote (or zygospore in specific cases).

== History ==
German zoologist Oscar Hertwig made some of the first discoveries of zygote formation in 1875. While working with sea urchins, Hertwig saw and was able to prove that only one sperm entered the ovum and sometime after the two pronuclei fused into one nucleus. From these observations Hertwig was able to conclude that an essential part of fertilization was the fusion of the two pronuclei to form the nucleus.

== In multicellular organisms ==
The zygote is the earliest developmental stage. In humans and most other anisogamous organisms, a zygote is formed when an egg cell and sperm cell come together to create a new unique organism.

The formation of a totipotent zygote with the potential to produce a whole organism depends on epigenetic reprogramming. DNA demethylation of the paternal genome in the zygote appears to be an important part of epigenetic reprogramming. In the paternal genome of the mouse, demethylation of DNA, particularly at sites of methylated cytosines, is likely a key process in establishing totipotency. Demethylation involves the processes of base excision repair and possibly other DNA-repair–based mechanisms.

=== Humans ===
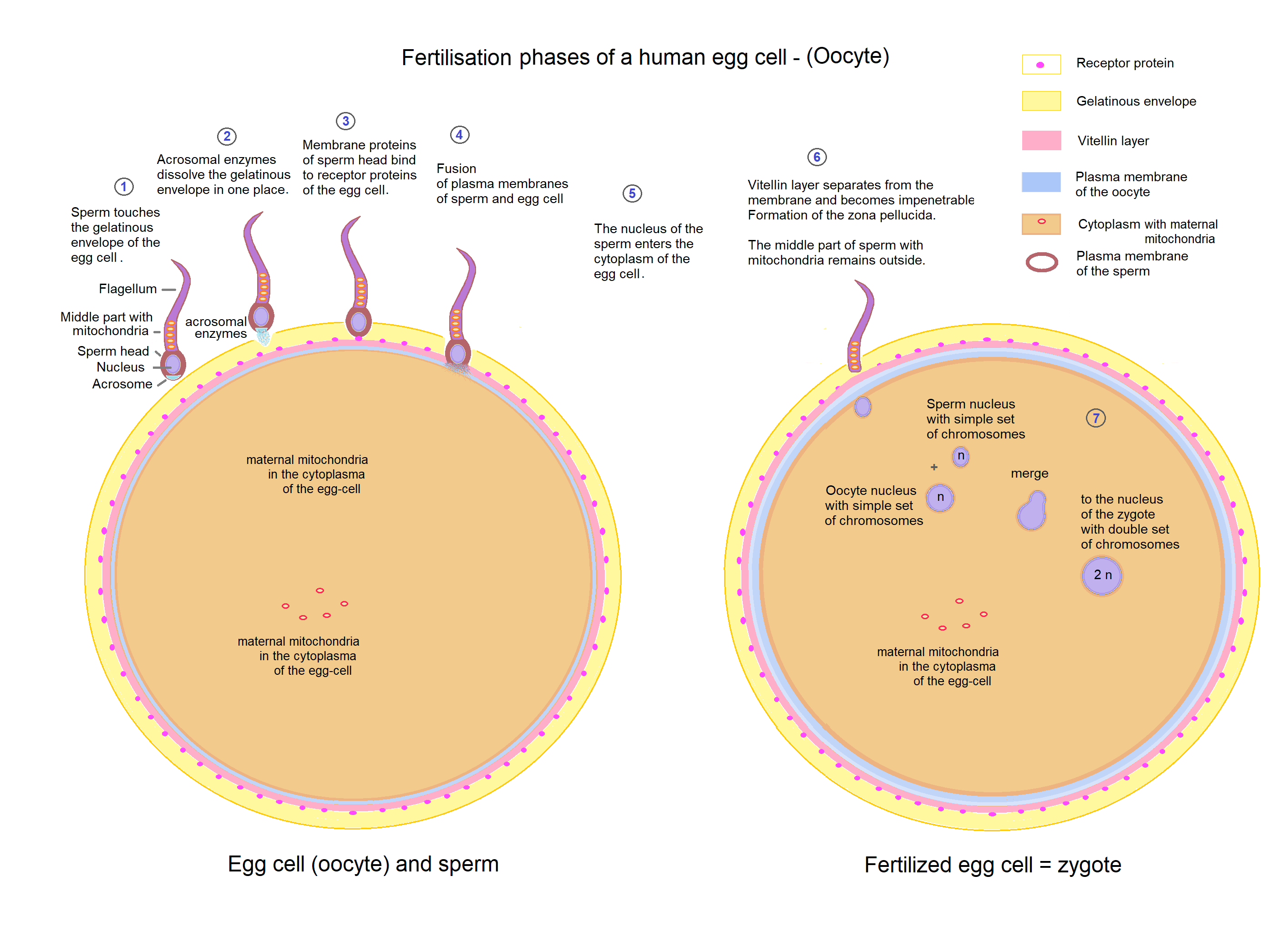

In human fertilization, a released ovum (a haploid secondary oocyte with replicate chromosome copies) and a haploid sperm cell (male gamete) combine to form a single diploid cell called the zygote. Once the single sperm fuses with the oocyte, the latter completes the division of the second meiosis forming a haploid daughter with only 23 chromosomes, almost all of the cytoplasm, and the male pronucleus. The other product of meiosis is the second polar body with only chromosomes but no ability to replicate or survive. In the fertilized daughter, DNA is then replicated in the two separate pronuclei derived from the sperm and ovum, making the zygote's chromosome number temporarily 4n diploid. After approximately 30 hours from the time of fertilization, a fusion of the pronuclei and immediate mitotic division produce two 2n diploid daughter cells called blastomeres. Between the stages of fertilization and implantation, the developing embryo is sometimes termed as a preimplantation embryo. This stage has also been referred to as the pre-embryo in legal discourses including relevance to the use of embryonic stem cells.

After fertilization, the conceptus travels down the fallopian tube towards the uterus while continuing to divide without actually increasing in size, in a process called cleavage. After four divisions, the conceptus consists of 16 blastomeres, and it is known as the morula. Through the processes of compaction, cell division, and blastulation, the conceptus takes the form of the blastocyst by the fifth day of development, just as it approaches the site of implantation. When the blastocyst hatches from the zona pellucida, it can implant in the endometrial lining of the uterus and begin the gastrulation stage of embryonic development.

The human zygote has been genetically edited in experiments designed to cure inherited diseases.

=== Fungi ===
In fungi, this cell may then enter meiosis or mitosis depending on the life cycle of the species.

=== Plants ===
In plants, the zygote may be polyploid if fertilization occurs between meiotically unreduced gametes.

In land plants, the zygote is formed within a chamber called the archegonium. In seedless plants, the archegonium is usually flask-shaped, with a long hollow neck through which the sperm cell enters. As the zygote divides and grows, it does so inside the archegonium.

== In single-celled organisms ==
The zygote can divide asexually by mitosis to produce identical offspring.

== See also ==
- Breastfeeding and fertility
- Fertilization
- Proembryo

Preceded by Oocyte + Sperm	Stages of human development Zygote	Succeeded by Embryo
