= Early stages of embryogenesis of tailless amphibians =

Embryogenesis in multicellular organisms can vary across taxonomic class or species. Organisms independent of aquatic habitats exhibit unique features during their embryonic development. Amphibians are notable as remnants of the first vertebrates capable of surviving in both aquatic and terrestrial environments. The embryonic development of tailless amphibians is presented below using the African clawed frog (Xenopus laevis) and the northern leopard frog (Lithobates pipiens) as examples.

The oocyte in these frog species is a polarized cell — it has specified axes and poles. The animal pole of the cell contains pigment cells, whereas the vegetal pole (the yolk) contains most of the nutritive material. The pigment is composed of light-absorbing melanin.

The sperm cell enters the oocyte in the region of the animal pole. Two blocks—defensive mechanisms meant to prevent polyspermy—occur: the fast block and the slow block. A relatively short time after fertilization, the cortical cytoplasm, located just beneath the cell membrane, rotates by 30 degrees, which results in the creation of the gray crescent; its establishment determines the location of the dorsal and ventral (up-down) axis, as well as of the anterior and posterior (front-back) axis and the dextro-sinistral (left-right) axis of the embryo.

== Gastrulation ==
The first visible stage of gastrulation is the creation of a concavity on the dorsal side, right under the gray crescent. Here begins the infiltration of cells of the future mesoderm. From this moment the embryo is called a gastrula, and the concave, visible from outside, is the emerging blastopore. Over the upper edge of the blastopore, called the dorsal lip, a migration of cells occurs, which derives from the central area of the gray crescent. The process of involution takes place – the dorsal lip turns in upon itself. The moving cells enter the blastocoele. As the blastopore deepens, a new embryonic cavity develops, the primitive gut, or the archenteron. It grows in length towards the future front part of the embryo. It can be seen from outside the embryo that the dorsal lip curves itself and grows, creating the side lips of the blastopore. During this time, the paraxial mesoderm enters the embryo. It will change into somitomeres. The bottom of the archenteron is composed of macromeres. They later transform into the gut of the embryo. The ventral lip of the blastopore develops, and the lateral plate mesoderm enters the blastocoel through it. The blastopore develops a ring-like shape, and surrounds the macromeres, creating the yolk sac. The process of involution occurs simultaneously with the process of epiboly, a cell movement associated with the covering of the embryo by the ectoderm. The blastopore gradually closes, and the macromeres, which are endodermal cells, are pulled inside of the embryo (the process of emboly). It can be seen from the outside as the shrinking of the yolk sac. Near the end of gastrulation, the yolk sac becomes entirely covered by the ectoderm, and the blastopore assumes the shape of a vertical cleavage. The three germ layers form a characteristic shape. The ectoderm is the outermost layer, the mesoderm is the middle one, and the endoderm forms the inside layer. Only in the locations of the future body openings (the mouth and the anus), the endoderm remains in immediate contact with the ectoderm. At the next stage of development, which is known as neurulation, the embryo grows in length along the anterior-posterior axis. Differentiation of the germ layers also occurs.

Cells communicate, which means that the type of environment of specific cells implies their future roles in the development of the embryo.

Cell movements during amphibian gastrulation

In frog embryos, gastrulation begins at the area of the gray crescent, which is on the embryo's future dorsal side and slightly below the equator. In this case, the cells invade to create a slit resembling a blastopore. These cells undergo drastic morphological changes. Each cell's body is pushed inward into the embryo's interior, but it nevertheless manages to stay in contact with the outside world through a thin neck. As the archenteron forms, it is lined with these bottle cells. Thus, an invasion of cells starts the creation of archenteron, just like in the gastrulating sea urchin. The marginal zone, or the area around the blastula's equator where the animal and vegetal hemispheres converge, is where gastrulation in frogs starts, as opposed to the most vegetal portion in sea urchins. Compared to most vegetal blastomeres, the endodermal cells in this area are smaller and less yolky.
