= Archenteron =

Anatomical structure in a developing embryo

The archenteron, also called the gastrocoel, is the internal cavity formed in the gastrulation stage in early embryonic development that becomes the cavity of the primitive gut.

== Formation in sea urchins ==
As primary mesenchyme cells detach from the vegetal pole in the gastrula and enter the fluid-filled cavity in the center (the blastocoel), the remaining cells at the vegetal pole flatten to form a vegetal plate. This buckles inwards towards the blastocoel in a process called invagination. The cells continue to be rearranged until the shallow dip formed by invagination transforms into a deeper, narrower pouch formed by the gastrula's endoderm. This pouch narrows and lengthens to become the archenteron, a process driven by convergent extension. The open end of the archenteron is called the blastopore.

The filopodia—thin fibers formed by the mesenchyme cells, found in late gastrulation—contract to drag the tip of the archenteron across the blastocoel. The endoderm of the archenteron will fuse with the ectoderm of the blastocoel wall. At this point gastrulation is complete, and the embryo has a functional digestive tube.

== Similar formation process in other animals ==
The indentation that is actually formed is called the lip of the blastopore or the dorsal lip in amphibians and fish, and the primitive streak in birds and mammals. Each is controlled by the dorsal lip and primitive node (also known as Hensen's node), respectively.

During gastrulation, the archenteron develops into the digestive tube, with the blastopore developing into either the mouth (in protostomes) or the anus (in deuterostomes).
