= Wolfram-like syndrome =

- Other names: Atypical Wolfram syndrome
- Specialty: Medical genetics
- Usual onset: Childhood
- Causes: Genetic mutation
- Differential diagnosis: Isolated diabetes mellitus/insipidus
- Prevention: None
- Frequency: Rare, very few cases have been described in medical literature
- Deaths: Some of the deaths are associated with the suicidal thoughts that a small number of people with the disorder have as a comorbidity to depression (rare symptom of Wolfram-like syndrome)

Wolfram-like syndrome is a rare autosomal dominant genetic disorder that shares some of the features shown by those affected with the autosomal recessive Wolfram syndrome. It is a type of WFS1-related disorder.

== Signs and symptoms ==
Individuals with Wolfram-like syndrome usually exhibit early-onset progressive hearing loss which starts around the age of 10 years old, early-onset optic atrophy which usually manifests in a person's mid-teenage–late adulthood years of life, and adult-onset diabetes mellitus.

Psychiatric symptoms can also rarely manifest in people with the condition, consisting of hallucinations, depression, anxiety, and sleep disorders. Psychosis and autism are sometimes seen as features of the disorder.

Other symptoms include nephrocalcinosis, psychomotor delay, glaucoma, and megalocornea.

== Complications ==
Psychiatric symptoms that may appear in patients with this condition, particularly depression, can cause a patient to live in a constantly miserable state of mind, which can lead some patients to develop suicidal tendencies, which can lead to committing suicide.

== Genetics ==
The condition is caused by mutations in the WFS1 gene, which are inherited in an autosomal dominant manner. This mutation is usually inherited, but there are cases where the mutation is de novo.

Mutations in WFS1 are also associated with other disorders affecting vision or hearing (aside from Wolfram syndrome), such as non-syndromic autosomal dominant deafness type 6 and isolated autosomal dominant congenital cataracts.

In rare cases, a mutation in the CDK13 gene is responsible for the disorder; this genetic mutation has only been described in three affected children belonging to a consanguineous Pakistani family who, in addition to the typical symptoms of the disorder, also had gastrointestinal tract anomalies, congenital heart defects, and clinodactyly.

== Diagnosis ==
The following diagnostic methods can be used to diagnose Wolfram-like syndrome:

- Genetic testing
  - Whole exome sequencing
  - Whole genome sequencing
  - Gene sequencing focused on the WFS1 gene
- Blood tests
  - A1C test
  - Oral glucose tolerance testing
- At-home hearing loss tests
  - Hearing loss screening mobile apps
  - Whisper test
- In clinical setting hearing loss tests
  - Audiometer tests
  - Tuning fork test
  - Physical examination
- Ophthalmoscopy
- Visual acuity examination

=== Psychiatric symptoms ===
- Depression
  - Use of the DSM-5 depression diagnosis criteria
  - Physical examination
  - Laboratory studies
  - Psychiatric evaluation
- Anxiety
  - Use of the DSM-5 criteria for anxiety disorder
  - Psychological evaluation

== Treatment ==
There is no standard management method for Wolfram-like syndrome.

== Prevalence ==
According to the Online Mendelian Inheritance in Man, around 15 to 20 cases from four affected families with Wolfram-like syndrome have been described in medical literature. All of the families studied were European by ancestry and nationality. The countries the families originated from were Denmark, the Netherlands, France, and Sweden.

== History ==
The disorder was seemingly first described in 1940 by Samuelson et al., where their patients were four members of a Swedish family with an apparently never-described-before combination of autosomal dominant sensorineural deafness and optic atrophy. The family was later re-examined in 2011 by Rendtorff et al.

In 2006, Eiberg et al. described four affected members from a three-generation Danish family, where affected individuals showed a phenotype similar to that shown by patients with Wolfram syndrome, though symptoms associated with the family's unique disorder was inherited following an autosomal dominant manner. All individuals had progressive hearing loss starting in childhood and optic atrophy with onset in either childhood or middle age. Three out of the four individuals were found to have irregular glucose regulation, one had reduced glucose tolerance, another one was found to have diabetes which was previously undiagnosed, and yet another one of the patients was found to have decreased function of the pancreas beta cells. One out of the four individuals had a diagnosed anxiety disorder as well as a sleep disorder. Non-syndromic isolated congenital deafness was found in two other family members, although they were otherwise unaffected.

The third case report was made by Valéro et al. in 2008, in which they described a 60-year-old man and his 81-year-old mother from France. Both of them had noninsulin-dependent diabetes mellitus and childhood-onset hearing loss. The mother was the most affected: her phenotype consisted of additional features her son did not suffer from, including severe vision impairment and bilateral optic nerve atrophy.

The fourth case report was written by Hogewind et al., whose patients were three affected members of a two-generation Dutch family (two brothers and their mother). The three of them suffered from hearing loss ranging from moderate to severe and optic neuropathy but they did not have any other symptoms, including the ones usually associated with both Wolfram syndrome and Wolfram-like syndrome (such as diabetes mellitus/insipidus or depression), but they had red-green colour blindness. The elder sibling and the mother were found to have severe hearing loss which heavily diminished their ability at recognizing speech, while the younger brother was relatively okay at doing so. All three individuals were found to have ocular scotomas (also known as blind spot) and neuroretinal rim loss. They were the only affected people with the disorder in their family.

The fifth case report was a re-examination of the Swedish family reported in 1940 by Samuelson et al. The phenotypical variability rate among affected family members was found to be high. Additional details were revealed in this reexamination of the family; the proband of the original study was found to not only suffer from the typical deafness-visual impairment phenotype commonly associated with the syndrome, but they also had hallucinations and depression. Four of their other family members had undergone therapy for anxiety and one of their family members committed suicide. Visual/ocular features included optic atrophy and glaucoma, the latter of which was highly treatable.

== Relation with Wolfram syndrome ==
Although both conditions are caused by a mutation in the WFS1 gene, they have different phenotypical features and different inheritance patterns. While Wolfram syndrome tends to follow an autosomal recessive inheritance pattern, Wolfram-like syndrome follows an autosomal dominant inheritance pattern. In Wolfram syndrome, symptoms such as intellectual disabilities, ataxia, anosmia, ageusia, and/or sleep apnea, alongside other cardiac and/or endocrine symptoms are absent in Wolfram-like syndrome. The onset of certain symptoms also differs between patients with Wolfram syndrome and patients with Wolfram-like syndrome. Hearing impairments are not present in every person with Wolfram-like syndrome. Wolfram-like syndrome is also known to be less severe than Wolfram syndrome.

== See also ==
- Delusional disorder
