= Dorsal lip =

The dorsal lip of the blastopore is a structure that forms during early embryonic development and is important for its role in organizing the germ layers. The dorsal lip is formed during early gastrulation as folding of tissue along the involuting marginal zone of the blastocoel forms an opening known as the blastopore. It is particularly important for its role in neural induction through the default model, where signaling from the dorsal lip protects a region of the epiblast from becoming epidermis, thus allowing it to develop to its default neural tissue.

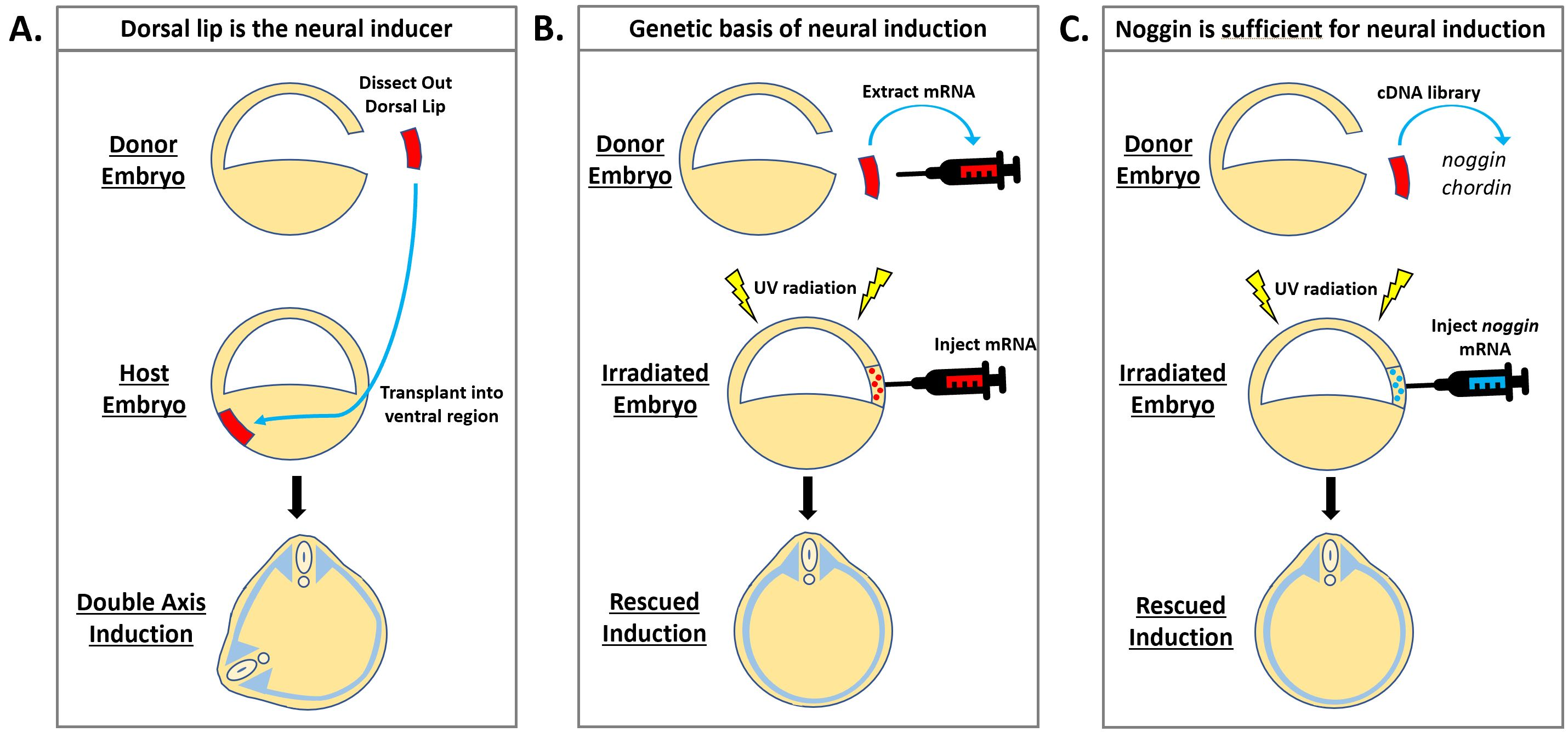
Figure 1: Mangold's dorsal lip transplant experiment in Xenopus demonstrated that a transplanted dorsal lip could induce the formation of a double axis in the new host embryo, solidifying the dorsal lip's sufficiency in neural induction (A). Injection of extracted mRNA from the dorsal lip into irradiated Xenopus embryos rescued neural induction and overall development demonstrating there is a genetic basis of neural induction (B). Establishment of cDNA libraries from extracted dorsal lip mRNA identified candidate genes that may be responsible for neural induction. One such candidate gene, noggin, is sufficient for rescuing development of irradiated embryos when its mRNA is injected (C).

== Discovery ==
The dorsal lip refers to the section of tissue located at the site of the first invagination in the developing pregastrula and is understood to act as both the neural inducer in the early embryo as well as the overall organizer of the entire body axis. Early transplantation experiments in developing embryos demonstrated that different layers of the embryo, when isolated and transplanted before gastrulation versus after gastrulation, would develop into distinctly different mature tissues. Dr. Hans Spemann noted this phenomenon and hypothesized that the tissue rearrangements that occurred during gastrulation must somehow be linked to controlling the fates of developing tissue in the embryo. His research focused on the dorsal lip as a possible organizer of these fate specification changes since it is the first structure to fold inwards during gastrulation. Transplantation of the dorsal lip from a Xenopus embryo into the ventral region of a different host embryo demonstrated that an entire secondary axis would form using the host embryo's own tissue, indicating a clear role of the dorsal lip as a neural inducer and organizer. The dorsal lip of the developing gastrula was thus denoted as the Spemann-Mangold organizer for its role in neural induction and organization of developing neural tissues.

Interest then shifted to identifying the chemical mechanisms underlying the dorsal lip's organizer function. Future experiments using a series of injections of dorsal lip mRNA into irradiated embryos demonstrated that the dorsal lip contained genetic factors that were sufficient for neural induction. Further investigations were able to identify specific factors such as noggin and chordin as genetic factors in the dorsal lip that are critical for proper neural development.

== Genetic information for neural induction ==
Experiments to identify the genetic basis for neural induction were conducted by exposing Xenopus embryos to UV radiation, which causes them to develop with no head. Dr. Richard Harland and Dr. William Smith extracted mRNA from the dorsal lip of normally developing Xenopus embryos that was then injected into the UV-radiated embryos to see if normal head development could be rescued. These experiments determined that noggin mRNA can induce normal head and brain development, and that increasing levels of noggin result in larger brain structures and eventually a secondary axis.

Similar experiments in the lab of Dr. Edward DeRobertis identified that chordin cDNA could also induce a secondary axis, suggesting that there is redundancy in the genes that code for neural development. To test whether only one or both genes are required for neural induction, genetically modified knockout mice were used. Mice that had either the noggin gene or the chordin gene deleted developed without some head structures such as ears, but had generally intact development. Mice that had a double knockout of both noggin and chordin, however, developed with no brain, demonstrating that there are multiple genes contributing to similar functions of neural development.

A different set of studies identified yet another molecule, follistatin, that is involved in neural induction. This was a result of the work of Doug Melton and Ali Hemmati-Brivanlou, who were studying the function of activin, a signalling molecule that acts on TGF-β receptors. They discovered that by mutating the activin receptor, tissue that would normally develop into epidermis instead becomes neural tissue. This gave insight into the signalling mechanism of neural induction, as it was shown that inhibiting TGF-β receptors leads to the formation of neural tissue. Follistatin was identified as a TGF-β inhibitor, and it was later shown that chordin and noggin both work alongside follistatin to inhibit bone morphogenic proteins (BMPs) from activating TGF-β. Through this signalling mechanism, the dorsal lip of the blastopore protects tissue from becoming epidermis, allowing the default formation of neural tissue

== Formation of the dorsal lip ==
Before the structural formation of the dorsal lip occurs another signaling center known as the Nieuwkoop center, located in the vegetal region of the developing blastocoel, is responsible for organizing the polarity patterns needed to form the dorsal lip. The Nieuwkoop center was discovered to be responsible for dorso-ventral polarity establishment through Wnt/GSK/beta-catenin. This dorsalizing signal allows for the Spemann organizer to become established in the dorsal marginal cells where the future site of the dorsal lip and blastopore will form.
