= Penicillium cyaneum =

Scientific classification
- Kingdom: Fungi
- Division: Ascomycota
- Class: Eurotiomycetes
- Order: Eurotiales
- Family: Aspergillaceae
- Genus: Penicillium
- Species: P. cyaneum

Binomial name
- Penicillium cyaneum Biourge, La Cellule 1923

Type strain
- ATCC 10432, BCRC 33337, CBST, CBS 119.51, CBS 315.48, CCRC 33337, FRR 0775, IFO 5337, IMI 039744, MUCL 38770, NBRC 5337

Synonyms
- Citromyces cyaneus

Species of fungus

Penicillium cyaneum is a species of the genus of Penicillium which was isolated from an oil-field. Penicillium cyaneum produces fatty acid, Brefeldin A and the antibiotic Cyanein

== See also ==
- List of Penicillium species
