= Unfolded protein response =

Cellular stress response

The unfolded protein response (UPR) is a cellular stress response related to the endoplasmic reticulum (ER) stress. It is named for its primary function: sensing the accumulation of unfolded or misfolded proteins and triggering a coordinated "response" to restore balance or induce cell death. It has been found to be conserved between mammalian species, as well as yeast and worms.

The UPR is activated in response to an accumulation of unfolded or misfolded proteins in the lumen of the endoplasmic reticulum. In this scenario, the UPR has three aims: initially to restore normal function of the cell by halting protein translation, degrading misfolded proteins, and activating the signaling pathways that lead to increasing the production of molecular chaperones involved in protein folding. If these objectives are not achieved within a certain time span or the disruption is prolonged, the UPR aims towards apoptosis.

Sustained overactivation of the UPR has been implicated in prion diseases as well as several other neurodegenerative diseases, including Wolfram syndrome, and inhibiting the UPR could become a treatment for those diseases. Diseases amenable to UPR inhibition include Creutzfeldt–Jakob disease, Alzheimer's disease, Parkinson's disease, Huntington's disease, and Wolfram syndrome.

== Protein folding in the endoplasmic reticulum ==
=== Protein synthesis ===
The term protein folding incorporates all the processes involved in the production of a protein after the nascent polypeptides have become synthesized by the ribosomes. The proteins destined to be secreted or sorted to other cell organelles carry an N-terminal signal sequence that will interact with a signal recognition particle (SRP). The SRP will lead the whole complex (Ribosome, RNA, polypeptide) to the ER membrane. Once the sequence has "docked", the protein continues translation, with the resultant strand being fed through the polypeptide translocator directly into the ER. Protein folding commences as soon as the polypeptide enters to the luminal environment, even as translation of the remaining polypeptide continues.

=== Protein folding and quality control ===
Protein folding steps involve a range of enzymes and molecular chaperones to coordinate and regulate reactions, in addition to a range of substrates required in order for the reactions to take place. The most important of these to note are N-linked glycosylation and disulfide bond formation. N-linked glycosylation occurs as soon as the protein sequence passes into the ER through the translocon, where it is glycosylated with a sugar molecule that forms the key ligand for the lectin molecules calreticulin (CRT; soluble in ER lumen) and calnexin (CNX; membrane bound). Favoured by the highly oxidizing environment of the ER, protein disulfide isomerases facilitate formation of disulfide bonds, which confer structural stability to the protein in order for it to withstand adverse conditions such as extremes of pH and degradative enzymes.

The ER is capable of recognizing misfolding proteins without causing disruption to the functioning of the ER. The aforementioned sugar molecule remains the means by which the cell monitors protein folding, as the misfolding protein becomes characteristically devoid of glucose residues, targeting it for identification and re-glycosylation by the enzyme UGGT (UDP-glucose:glycoprotein glucosyltransferase). If this fails to restore the normal folding process, exposed hydrophobic residues of the misfolded protein are bound by the protein glucose regulate protein 78 (Grp78), a heat shock protein 70kDa family member that prevents the protein from further transit and secretion.

Where circumstances continue to cause a particular protein to misfold, the protein is recognized as posing a threat to the proper functioning of the ER, as they can aggregate to one another and accumulate. In such circumstances the protein is guided through endoplasmic reticulum-associated degradation (ERAD). The chaperone EDEM guides the retrotranslocation of the misfolded protein back into the cytosol in transient complexes with PDI and Grp78. Here it enters the ubiquitin-proteasome pathway, as it is tagged by multiple ubiquitin molecules, targeting it for degradation by cytosolic proteasomes.

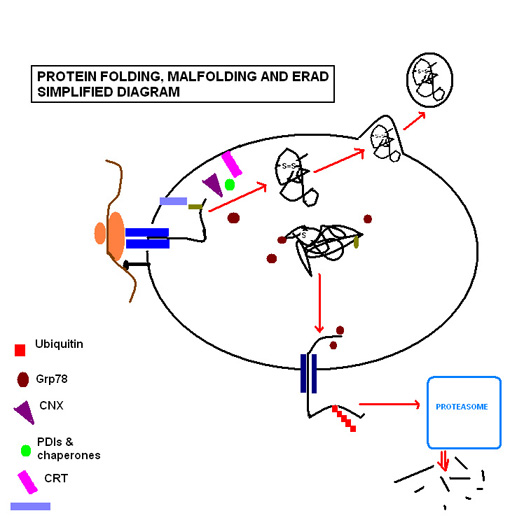
A simplified diagram of the processes involved in protein folding. The polypeptide is translated from its ribosome directly into the ER, where it is glycosylated and guided through modification steps to reach its desired conformation. It is then transported from the ER to the Golgi apparatus for final modifications. Where misfolding proteins continually breach quality control, chaperones including Grp78 facilitate its removal from the ER through retrotranslocation, where it is broken down by the ubiquitin-proteasome pathway as part of the ERAD system.

Successful protein folding requires a tightly controlled environment of substrates that include glucose to meet the metabolic energy requirements of the functioning molecular chaperones; calcium that is stored bound to resident molecular chaperones; and redox buffers that maintain the oxidizing environment required for disulfide bond formation.

Unsuccessful protein folding can be caused by HLA-B27, disturbing balance of important (IL-10 and TNF) signaling proteins. At least some disturbances are reliant on correct HLA-B27 folding.

However, where circumstances cause a more global disruption to protein folding that overwhelms the ER's coping mechanisms, the UPR is activated.

== Molecular mechanism ==
=== Initiation ===
The molecular chaperone BiP/Grp78 has a range of functions within the ER. It maintains specific transmembrane receptor proteins involved in initiation of the downstream signalling of the UPR in an inactive state by binding to their luminal domains. An overwhelming load of misfolded proteins or simply the over-expression of proteins (e.g. IgG) requires more of the available BiP/Grp78 to bind to the exposed hydrophobic regions of these proteins, and consequently BiP/Grp78 dissociates from these receptor sites to meet this requirement. Dissociation from the intracellular receptor domains allows them to become active. PERK dimerizes with BiP in resting cells and oligomerizes in ER-stressed cells.

Although this is traditionally the accepted model, doubts have been raised over its validity. It has been argued that the genetic and structural evidence supporting the model simply shows BiP dissociation to be merely correlated with Ire1 activation, rather than specifically causing it. An alternative model has been proposed, whereby unfolded proteins interact directly with the ER-lumenal domain of Ire1, causing oligomerization and transautophosphorylation. However these models are not mutually exclusive, it is also possible that both direct interaction of Ire1 with unfolded proteins and dissociation of BiP from IRE1 contribute to the activation of the Ire1 pathway.

=== Functions ===
The initial phases of UPR activation have two key roles:

==== Translation Attenuation and Cell Cycle Arrest by the PERK Receptor ====
This occurs within minutes to hours of UPR activation to prevent further translational loading of the ER. PERK (protein kinase RNA-like endoplasmic reticulum kinase) activates itself by oligomerization and autophosphorylation of the free luminal domain. The activated cytosolic domain causes translational attenuation by directly phosphorylating the α subunit of the regulating initiator of the mRNA translation machinery, eIF2. This also produces translational attenuation of the protein machinery involved in running the cell cycle, producing cell cycle arrest in the G1 phase. PERK deficiency may have a significant impact on physiological states associated with ER stress. This can be demonstrated via the necessity for the viability of pancreatic beta (β) cells due to their requirement for protein folding during the synthesis of the proinsulin polypeptide chain. Studies in mice have demonstrated that the complete loss of PERK function will be guaranteed to result in the rapid death of beta cells and the consequential development of diabetes mellitus, suggesting that inhibition of this pathway for the sake of therapeutic purpose may carry a risk of pancreatic toxicity.

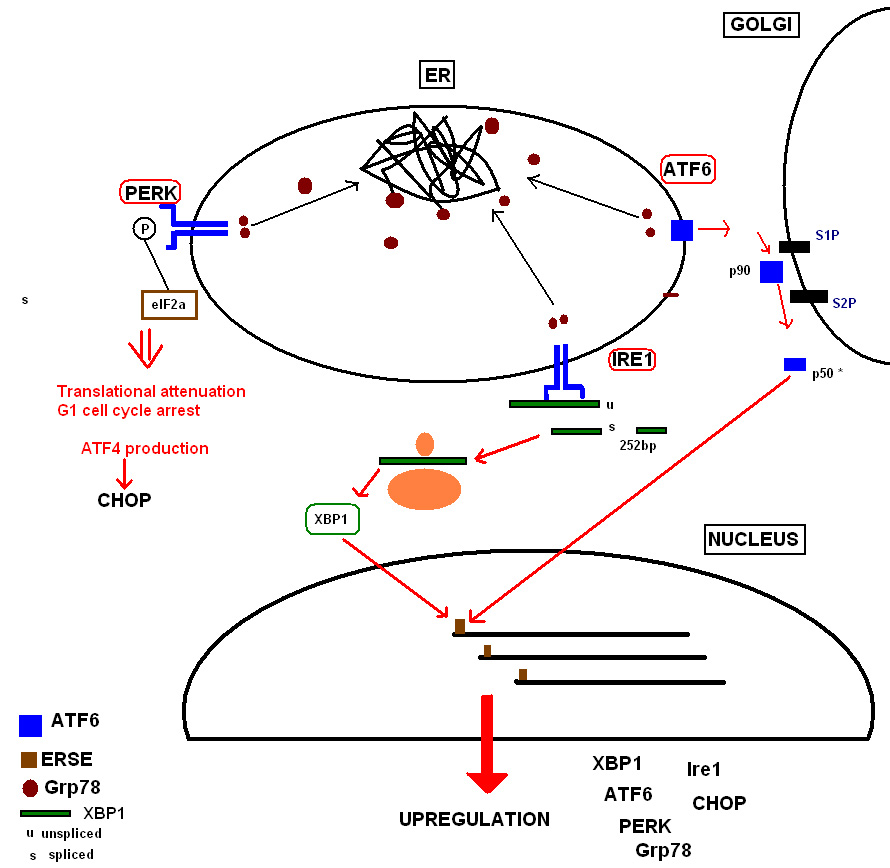
A simplified diagram of the initiation of the UPR by prolonged and overwhelming protein misfolding. Grp78 recruitment to chaperone the misfolded proteins results in Grp78 dissociation from its conformational binding state of the transmembrane receptor proteins PERK, IRE1 and ATF6. Dissociation results in receptor homodimerisation and oligomerisation to an active state. The activated cytosolic domain of PERK phosphorylates the eIF2alpha, inhibiting translation and resulting in cell cycle arrest. The activated cytosolic domain of IRE1 cleaves the 26bp intron from its substrate XBP1, facilitating its translation to form the transcription factor XBP1. Activated ATF6 translocates to the Golgi, cleaved by proteases to form an active 50kDa fragment (ATF6 p50). ATF6 p50 and XBP1 bind ERSE promoters in the nucleus to produce upregulation of the proteins involved in the unfolded protein response.

==== Increased Production of Proteins Involved in the Functions of the UPR ====
UPR activation also results in upregulation of proteins involved in chaperoning malfolding proteins, protein folding and ERAD, including further production of Grp78. Ultimately this increases the cell's molecular mechanisms by which it can deal with the misfolded protein load. These receptor proteins have been identified as:

- Inositol-requiring kinase 1, whose free luminal domain activates itself by homodimerisation and transautophosphorylation. The activated domain is able to activate the transcription factor XBP1(Xbox binding protein) mRNA (the mammalian equivalent of the yeast Hac1 mRNA) by cleavage and removal of a 26bp intron. The activated transcription factor upregulates UPR 'stress genes' by directly binding to stress element promoters in the nucleus.
- ATF6 (activating transcription factor 6) is a basic leucine zipper transcription factor. Upon Grp78 dissociation, the entire 90kDa protein translocates to the Golgi, where it is cleaved by proteases to form an active 50kDa transcription factor that translocates to the nucleus. It binds to stress element promoters upstream of genes that are upregulated in the UPR.

The aim of these responses is to remove the accumulated protein load whilst preventing any further addition to the stress, so that normal function of the ER can be restored as soon as possible.

If the UPR pathway is activated in an abnormal fashion, such as when obesity triggers chronic ER stress and the pathway is constitutively active, this can lead to insensitivity to insulin signaling and thus insulin resistance. Obese individuals have an elevated demand placed on the secretory and synthesis systems of their cells. This activates cellular stress signaling and inflammatory pathways because of the abnormal conditions disrupting ER homeostasis.

A downstream effect of the ER stress is a significant decrease in insulin-stimulated phosphorylation of tyrosine residues of insulin receptor substrate (IRS-1), which is the substrate for insulin tyrosine kinase (the insulin receptor). C-Jun N-terminal kinase (JNK) is also activated at high levels by IRE-1α, which itself is phosphorylated to become activated in the presence of ER stress. Subsequently, JNK phosphorylates serine residues of IRS-1, and thus inhibits insulin receptor signaling. IRE-1α also recruits tumor necrosis factor receptor-associated factor 2 (TRAF2). This kinase cascade that is dependent on IRE-1α and JNK mediates ER stress–induced inhibition of insulin action.

Obesity provides chronic cellular stimuli for the UPR pathway as a result of the stresses and strains placed upon the ER, and without allowing restoration to normal cellular responsiveness to insulin hormone signaling, an individual becomes very likely to develop type 2 diabetes.

Skeletal muscles are sensitive to physiological stress, as exercise can impair ER homeostasis. This causes the expression of ER chaperones to be induced by the UPR in response to the exercise-induced ER stress. Muscular contraction during exercise causes calcium to be released from the sarcoplasmic reticulum (SR), a specialized ER network in skeletal muscles. This calcium then interacts with calcineurin and calcium/calmodulin-dependent kinases that in turn activate transcription factors. These transcription factors then proceed to alter the expression of exercise-regulated muscle genes. PGC-1alpha, a transcriptional coactivator, is a key transcription factor involved in mediating the UPR in a tissue-specific manner in skeletal muscles by coactivating ATF6alpha. Therefore, PGC-1alpha gets expressed in muscles after acute and long-term exercise training. The function of this transcription factor is to increase the number and function of mitochondria, as well as to induce a switch of skeletal fibers to slow oxidative muscle fibers, as these are fatigue-resistant. Therefore, this UPR pathway mediates changes in muscles that have undergone endurance training by making them more resistant to fatigue and protecting them from future stress.

=== Initiating apoptosis ===
In conditions of prolonged stress, the goal of the UPR changes from being one that promotes cellular survival to one that commits the cell to a pathway of apoptosis. Proteins downstream of all 3 UPR receptor pathways have been identified as having pro-apoptotic roles. However, the point at which the 'apoptotic switch' is activated has not yet been determined, but it is a logical consideration that this should be beyond a certain time period in which resolution of the stress has not been achieved. The two principal UPR receptors involved are Ire1 and PERK.

By binding with the protein TRAF2, Ire1 activates a JNK signaling pathway, at which point human procaspase 4 is believed to cause apoptosis by activating downstream caspases.

Although PERK is recognised to produce a translational block, certain genes can bypass this block. An important example is that the proapoptotic protein CHOP (CCAAT/-enhancer-binding protein homologous protein), is upregulated downstream of the bZIP transcription factor ATF4 (activating transcription factor 4) and uniquely responsive to ER stress. CHOP causes downregulation of the anti-apoptotic mitochondrial protein Bcl-2, favouring a pro-apoptotic drive at the mitochondria by proteins that cause mitochondrial damage, cytochrome c release and caspase 3 activation.

== Role in Disease ==
Wolfram syndrome represents a prototype human disorder caused by dysregulated unfolded protein response. Wolfram syndrome is caused by mutations in the WFS1 gene, which encodes a transmembrane protein of the endoplasmic reticulum. WFS1 has been identified as a novel component of the UPR and plays a critical role in maintaining ER homeostasis in pancreatic β-cells; loss of WFS1 function leads to chronic ER stress and β-cell apoptosis, contributing to the diabetes mellitus characteristic of the syndrome. Furthermore, WFS1 has been shown to negatively regulate ER stress signaling: in both rodent and human cells, WFS1 suppresses IRE1α and ATF6α pathways, and loss of this regulation results in amplified ER stress responses and cell death. The clinical features, diagnostic criteria, and therapeutic approaches for Wolfram syndrome have been comprehensively reviewed, underscoring its importance as a model disease for ER stress-related neurodegeneration and endocrinopathy.

Diseases amenable to UPR inhibition include Creutzfeldt–Jakob disease, Alzheimer's disease, Parkinson's disease, and Huntington's disease.

Endoplasmic reticulum stress was reported to play a major role in non‐alcoholic fatty liver disease (NAFLD) induction and progression. High fat diet fed rats showed increased ER stress markers CHOP, XBP1, and GRP78. ER stress is known to activate hepatic de novo lipogenesis, inhibit VLDL secretion, promote insulin resistance and inflammatory process, and promote cell apoptosis. Thus it increase the level of fat accumulation and worsens the NAFLD to a more serious hepatic state. Zingiber officinale (ginger) extract and omega‐3 fatty acids were reported to ameliorate endoplasmic reticulum stress in a nonalcoholic fatty liver rat model.

As stated above, the UPR can also be activated as a compensatory mechanism in disease states. For instance, the UPR is up-regulated in an inherited form of dilated cardiomyopathy due to a mutation in gene encoding the Phospholamban protein. Further activation proved therapeutic in a human induced pluripotent stem cell model of PLN mutant dilated cardiomyopathy.

== Chemical inducers ==
Examples of chemicals used to induce ER stress and the UPR in cultured systems:

- Brefeldin A inhibits protein transport from the ER into the Golgi apparatus, while inducing the transport back from the latest to the ER. This double effect increases the stress in the endoplasmatic reticulum due to the accumulation of proteins.
- Thapsigargin leads to ER Ca^{2+} depletion due to inhibition of the Sarco/Endoplasmic Reticulum Ca^{2+}-ATPase (SERCA). This effect disrupts Ca^{2+} homeostasis, crucial for ER chaperones activation.
- A23187 is an ion transporter that increases the concentration of Ca^{2+} intracellularly, disrupting homeostasis and increasing ER stress.
- 2-deoxyglucose is a glucose analogue that reduces the production of ATP and lactate in the cell by non-competitive inhibition of hexokinases, inhibiting cell growth and inducing ER stress.
- dithiothreitol reduces the disulfide bridges of proteins and blocks its formation, inducing the accumulation of denatured proteins inside the ER.
- fenretinide and bortezomib (Velcade), each acting via different cellular mechanisms, induce ER stress, leading to apoptosis in melanoma cells.
- tunicamycin inhibits a transferase involved in the first step of glycoprotein synthesis, causing ER stress through the accumulation of unfolded glycoproteins.
- ErSO activates the unfolded protein response and has anti cancer activity.
- MG132 is a proteosome inhibitor that blocks ERAD and therefore increases the accumulation of proteins in the ER.
- Monensin disrupts the pH balance of the ER and Golgi, essential for protein folding and vesicle trafficking.
- Eeyarestatin I inhibits the ERAD.

== Biological inducers ==
- Dengue virus induces PERK dependent ER stress as part of virus induced response in infected cells to favor replication.
- Influenza virus requires endoplasmic reticulum protein 57-kD (ERp57) for replication and apoptosis induction in infected cells.

== See also ==
- Endoplasmic reticulum stress response (ER stress)
- Mitochondrial unfolded protein response
- Aggresome
- PERK inhibitors
