= Penicillium zonatum =

Scientific classification
- Kingdom: Fungi
- Division: Ascomycota
- Class: Eurotiomycetes
- Order: Eurotiales
- Family: Aspergillaceae
- Genus: Penicillium
- Species: P. zonatum

Binomial name
- Penicillium zonatum Hodges, C.S. Jr; Perry, J.J. 1973

Type strain
- ATCC 24353, CBS 992.72, FRR 1550, FSL-525, IFO 31741, IMI 216907, NBRC 31741

Species of fungus

Penicillium zonatum is an anamorph species of fungus in the genus Penicillium which was isolated from soil. Penicillium zonatum produces xanthomegin, brefeldin A and janthitrem B
