= C9H13N3O6 =

The molecular formula C_{9}H_{13}N_{3}O_{6} may refer to:

- Mizoribine
- Pyrazofurin
