= CISD2 =

Protein-coding gene in humans

Available structures
PDB	Ortholog search: PDBe RCSB
PDB	List of PDB id codes 3FNV, 4OO7, 4OOA

Identifiers
- Aliases: CISD2, ERIS, Miner1, NAF-1, WFS2, ZCD2, CDGSH iron sulfur domain 2
- External IDs: OMIM: 611507; MGI: 1914256; HomoloGene: 36436; GeneCards: CISD2; OMA:CISD2 - orthologs

Gene location (Human)
Chr.	Chromosome 4 (human)
Band	4q24	Start	102,868,974 bp
Band	4q24	End	102,892,807 bp

Gene location (Mouse)
Chr.	Chromosome 3 (mouse)
Band	3|3 G3	Start	135,112,173 bp
Band	3|3 G3	End	135,129,686 bp
RNA expression pattern
Bgee	Human / Mouse (ortholog); Top expressed in: pancreatic epithelial cell; tendon of biceps brachii; islet of Langerhans; internal globus pallidus; pons; cerebellar vermis; right lobe of liver; pancreatic ductal cell; bone marrow cell; C1 segment / Top expressed in: interventricular septum; myocardium of ventricle; right kidney; soleus muscle; Paneth cell; extraocular muscle; proximal tubule; temporal muscle; digastric muscle; retinal pigment epithelium; More reference expression data
BioGPS	n/a
Gene ontology
Molecular function	iron-sulfur cluster binding; protein binding; protein homodimerization activity; metal ion binding; 2 iron, 2 sulfur cluster binding; RNA binding
Cellular component	intracellular membrane-bounded organelle; integral component of membrane; mitochondrial outer membrane; endoplasmic reticulum membrane; endoplasmic reticulum; membrane; mitochondrion; protein-containing complex; perinuclear endoplasmic reticulum
Biological process	autophagy; regulation of autophagy; autophagy of mitochondrion; multicellular organism aging
Sources:Amigo / QuickGO
Orthologs
Species	Human	Mouse
Entrez	493856	67006
Ensembl	ENSG00000145354	ENSMUSG00000028165
UniProt	Q8N5K1	Q9CQB5
RefSeq (mRNA)	NM_001008388	NM_025902
RefSeq (protein)	NP_001008389	NP_080178
Location (UCSC)	Chr 4: 102.87 – 102.89 Mb	Chr 3: 135.11 – 135.13 Mb
PubMed search
- Wikidata
View/Edit Human	View/Edit Mouse

CDGSH iron sulfur domain 2 is a protein that in humans is encoded by the CISD2 gene.

== Function ==
The protein encoded by this gene is a zinc finger protein that localizes to the endoplasmic reticulum. The encoded protein binds an iron/sulfur cluster and may be involved in calcium homeostasis. Defects in this gene are a cause of Wolfram syndrome 2. [provided by RefSeq, Mar 2011].

== See also ==
- CDGSH iron sulfur domain
