= Wolfram syndrome =

Human disease

- Other names: Diabetes insipidus-diabetes mellitus-optic atrophy-deafness syndrome
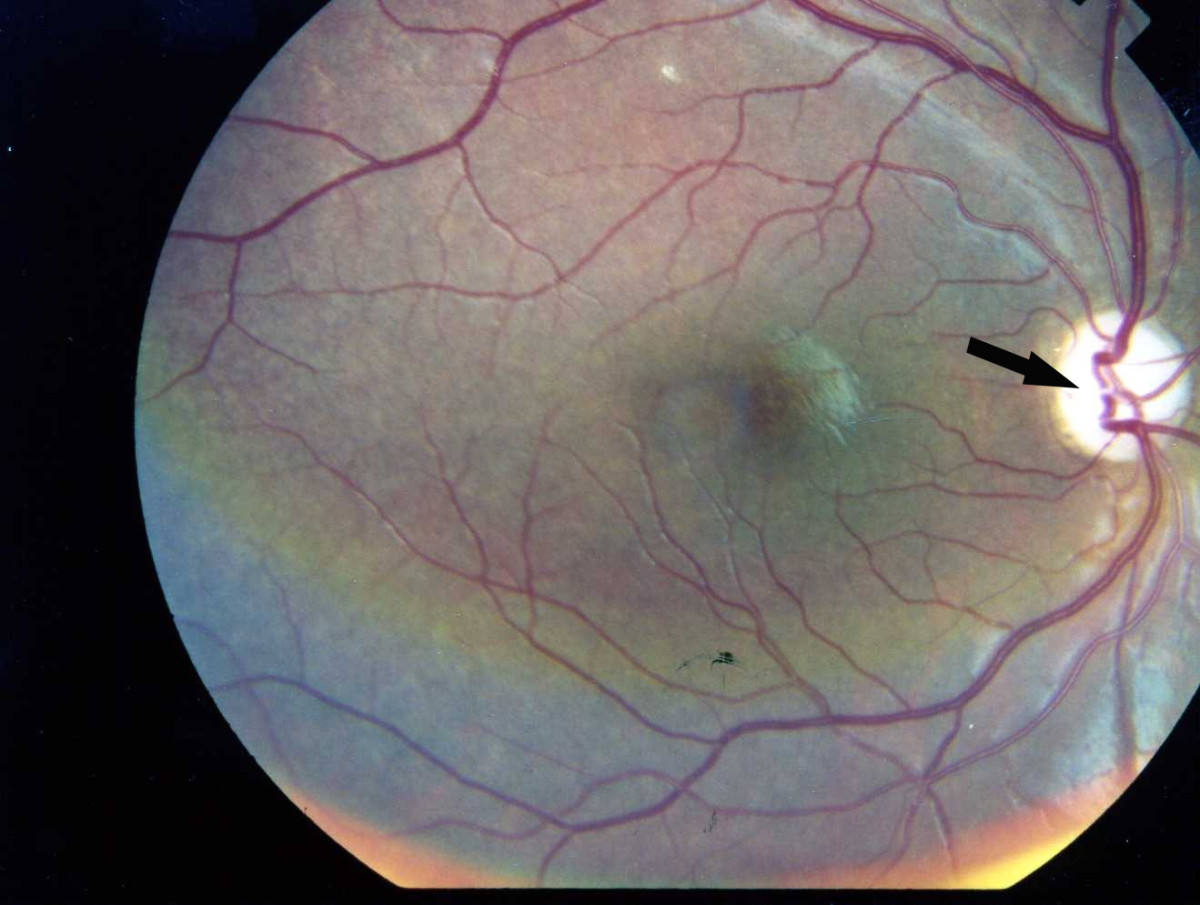
- Photographic image of the eye showing optic atrophy without retinopathy; from Manaviat et al., 2009
- Specialty: Medical genetics, neurology, endocrinology
- Symptoms: Diabetes, visual and hearing impairments, neurological degeneration
- Duration: Lifelong
- Types: WFS1 mutation, CISD2 mutation
- Causes: mutations of WFS1 and CISD2 genes
- Diagnostic method: Genetic testing
- Frequency: <5000 in United States (2024)

Wolfram syndrome, also called DIDMOAD (diabetes insipidus, diabetes mellitus, optic atrophy, and deafness), is a rare autosomal-recessive genetic disorder that causes childhood-onset diabetes mellitus, optic atrophy, and deafness as well as various other possible disorders including neurodegeneration. Symptoms can begin to appear as early as childhood to adult years (2–65 years old). There is a 25% recurrence risk in children.

It was first described in four siblings in 1938 by Dr. Don J. Wolfram, M.D. In 1995, diagnostic criteria were created based on the profiles of 45 patients. The disease affects the central nervous system (especially the brainstem). Wolfram syndrome is caused by pathogenic variants (mutations) in one of two genes — WFS1 or CISD2 — with the majority of patients carrying mutations in the WFS1 gene. The first causative gene for Wolfram syndrome, WFS1, was discovered by Dr. M. Alan Permutt, M.D. at Washington University in St. Louis. Wolfram syndrome was subsequently established as a prototype endoplasmic reticulum disorder caused by dysregulated unfolded protein response by Dr. Fumihiko Urano, M.D., Ph.D. at Washington University in St. Louis.

Fewer than 5,000 people in the US have this disease, with WFS1-Wolfram Syndrome being more common than CISD2-Wolfram Syndrome.

== Signs and symptoms ==
The first symptom is typically diabetes mellitus, which is usually diagnosed around the age of 6. Insulin-dependent diabetes mellitus associate with Wolfram syndrome is differed from type 1 diabetes mellitus by having earlier diagnosis, rarely having positive auto-antibodies and ketoacidosis, having longer remission, needing less daily insulin, having lower average HbA1c level and more frequent hypoglycemia.

The second most common clinical manifestation of the disease is cranial diabetes insipidus, which the kidneys are less able to retain water due to a decrease in the hormonal signalling from the hypothalamic pituitary axis. This condition affects around 70% of people with WSF1 mutations (CISD2 mutations do not typically associate with diabetes insipidus). Diabetes insipidus occurs around the age of 14, but the condition is often diagnosed late. Therefore, there is a high variability in the onset age.

The next symptom to appear is often optic atrophy, optic nerve shrinkage due to retinal ganglion cell axons' degeneration, around the age of 11. Blindness tends to develop a few years after the decrease in visual ability with the loss of color vision. Ophthalmic abnormalities often found in the patient with Wolfram Syndrome are cataract, nystagmus, glaucoma and maculopathy. There is also pigmentary retinopathy due to mitochondrial alteration that associated with Wolfram Syndrome. However, it is very rare and have been found in just a few cases.

Approximately 65% of people with Wolfram syndrome experience sensorineural deafness, which can manifest as deafness at birth or mild hearing loss in adolescent years and progressively worsen. However, the progression of sensorineural deafness is relatively slow and initially influences high-frequency sounds. Patients with WFS1 mutation have degenerative impairment in the central nervous system, as they increased in age they are more likely to suffer a more severe deafness than other patients that have hearing loss.

The majority of people (>60%) with WSF1 mutation develop neurological symptoms around the age of 40; however, some may experience these symptoms earlier in life. Some of the most common neurological abnormalities are cerebellar ataxia, peripheral neuropathy, epilepsy, cognitive impairment, dysphagia, dysarthria and diminished sense of taste and smell. In addition, the patient can also experienced orthostatic hypotension, gastroparesis, hypothermia or hyperthermia, hypohidrosis or hyperhidrosis, constipation and headache. Furthermore, there are also cases in which patients also have severe depression, sleep abnormalities, psychosis and physical aggression. The occurrence of the above conditions can add complexity to the clinical presentation of Wolfram syndrome.

Urinary tract disorders are also found in more than 90% patient with Wolfram Syndrome, in which neurogenic bladder is the main manifestation of neurological disorder that can lead to urinary incontinence, hydroureter and recurrent infections. Recurrent UTIs are one of the most prevalent clinical challenges associated with Wolfram syndrome. These urological abnormalities usually onset at the age of 20 and can peak at 13, 21 and 33 years of age. Furthermore, bladder dysfunction can progress over time.

Endocrine dysfunction is another clinical manifestation of Wolfram syndrome, which include hypogonadism. More specifically, hypogonadism presents more frequent in male than female. Male patients are more likely to experience fertility impairment and erectile dysfunction, while female patients may encounter menstrual abnormalities. Additionally, due to the decrease in function of the anterior pituitary gland, patients with Wolfram syndrome can also have short statue, growth hormone deficiency and corticotrophin secretion deficiency. Since patients with Wolfram syndrome can experience diabetes mellitus, diabetes insipidus and urinary tract disorder, they are treated with desmopressin, which can lead to the development of hyponatremia.

Other abnormalities associated with Wolfram syndrome include gastrointestinal disorders (gastroparesis and bowel incontinence) and heart disease. These disorders have been reported in rare cases of WFS1 mutation.

== Causes ==
Wolfram syndrome was initially thought to be caused by mitochondrial dysfunction due to several reports of mitochondrial DNA mutations. However, it has now been established that Wolfram syndrome is caused by a congenital endoplasmic reticulum (ER) dysfunction.

Diagram showing the transmission of autosomal recessive diseases such as Wolfram syndrome

Two forms have been described: WFS1-Wolfram syndrome and CISD2-Wolfram syndrome.

=== WFS1-Wolfram syndrome ===
The WFS1 or wolframin gene provides instructions for making the wolframin protein. The WFS1 gene is active in cells throughout the body, with strong activity in the heart, brain, lungs, inner ear, and pancreas. The pancreas provides enzymes that help digest food, and it also produces the hormone insulin. Insulin controls how much glucose (a type of sugar) is passed from the blood into cells for conversion to energy.

Within cells, wolframin is located the endoplasmic reticulum. Among its many activities, the endoplasmic reticulum folds and modifies newly formed proteins so they have the correct 3-dimensional shape to function properly. The endoplasmic reticulum also helps transport proteins, fats, and other materials to specific sites within the cell or to the cell surface. The function of wolframin is unknown. Based on its location in the endoplasmic reticulum, however, it may play a role in protein folding or cellular transport. In the pancreas, wolframin may help fold a protein precursor of insulin (called proinsulin) into the mature hormone that controls blood glucose levels. Research findings also suggest that wolframin may help maintain the correct cellular level of charged calcium atoms (calcium ions) by controlling how much is stored in the endoplasmic reticulum. In the inner ear, wolframin may help maintain the proper levels of calcium ions or other charged particles that are essential for hearing. Mutation in the WFS1 lead to ER stress due to an increase in the accumulation of misfolded proteins. As there is a high level of misfolded protein, unfolded protein response (UPR) is stimulated and lead to transcriptional and translational process that can restore ER homeostasis, However, if the ER stress is present persistently due to physiological or pathophysiological events, the UPR will induce apoptosis.

=== Other disorders – caused by dominant mutations in the WFS1 gene ===
In addition to the classic, autosomal recessive form of Wolfram syndrome, which results from biallelic (two-copy) loss-of-function variants in WFS1, a single pathogenic variant affecting one copy of the gene can cause a group of related but clinically distinct conditions. These autosomal dominant WFS1-related disorders may be inherited from an affected parent or arise as new (de novo) variants, and they span a wide spectrum of severity.

At the milder end, individuals may have isolated features such as low-frequency sensorineural hearing loss, optic neuropathy, or congenital cataracts, and some present with combinations of hearing loss and optic atrophy. More than 30 WFS1 variants have been identified in individuals with a form of nonsyndromic deafness (hearing loss without related signs and symptoms affecting other parts of the body) called DFNA6. Individuals with DFNA6 deafness cannot hear low tones (low-frequency sounds), such as a tuba or the "m" in moon. DFNA6 hearing loss is unlike most forms of nonsyndromic deafness that affect high tones (high-frequency sounds), such as birds chirping, or all frequencies of sound. Most WFS1 pathogenic variants replace one of the protein building blocks (amino acids) used to make wolframin with an incorrect amino acid. One variant deletes an amino acid from wolframin. WFS1 pathogenic variants probably alter the 3-dimensional shape of wolframin, which could affect its function. Because the function of wolframin is unknown, however, it is unclear how WFS1 pathogenic variants cause hearing loss. Some researchers suggest that altered wolframin disturbs the balance of charged particles in the inner ear, which interferes with the hearing process.

At the most severe end of this spectrum is Hattersley-Urano syndrome, caused by specific dominant, de novo, endoplasmic reticulum (ER) stress-inducing WFS1 missense variants. In contrast to the milder dominant disorders and to recessive Wolfram syndrome, these variants tend to aggregate within the ER and induce robust ER stress, producing a severe congenital syndrome of neonatal- or infancy-onset diabetes, congenital sensorineural deafness, and congenital cataracts, frequently accompanied by low muscle tone (hypotonia).

=== CISD2-Wolfram Syndrome ===
CISD2-Wolfram Syndrome is a subtype of Wolfram Syndrome caused by a mutation in the CDGSH iron-sulfur domain-containing protein 2 gene (CISD2 gene). CISD2 is a protein coding gene that is primarily found on the endoplasmic reticulum (ER), though some studies have shown that it can also be localized in the mitochondrial outer membrane. Mutation of this gene effects the protein folding of the ER and functions of the mitochondria, which leads to the signs and symptoms seen in those with CISD2-Wolfram Syndrome. In some cases, mutation of the gene can lead to premature aging, mitophagy and mitochondrial dysfunction. In studies using mice, loss of function of CISD2 caused a decrease in ER Ca2+ and increase in mitochondrial Ca2+. This causes an increase in stress to the ER and activates an unfolded protein response (UPR). Further studies are still needed to better understand CISD2-Wolfram Syndrome and the neurodegenerative effects it has.

Clinical features of both WFS1-Wolfram syndrome and CISD2-Wolfram syndrome are diabetes mellitus, optic atrophy/neuropathy, sensorineural deafness, and genitourinary problems. Although both types have some overlapping symptoms, there are some differences that help us distinguish between the two. One of the main ones is that WFS2, it is not associated with diabetes insipidus or psychiatric disorders but is instead associated with higher bleed risks and peptic ulcers.

CISD2 gene consists of 3 exons on chromosome 4q24, which encodes the protein NAF-1 (nutrient deprivation autophagy factor-1). Therefore, if WFS2 were suspected in a patient, it may help to do a gene sequencing of the three exons and their intronic regions for a genetic analysis.

CISD2-Wolfram syndrome is the rarest and most recently discovered subtype of Wolfram syndrome.

== Epidemiology ==
Wolfram syndrome is considered a rare autosomal recessive neurodegenerative disease. According to the draft International Classification of Disease (ICD-11), Wolfram syndrome is classified as a rare specified diabetes mellitus. The disease is estimated to affect 1 in 160,000 to 770,000. More specifically, the disease prevalence is 1 in 770,000 in the UK, 1 in 710,000 in Japan, 1 in 100,000 in North America, 0.74 in 1,000,000 in Italy, 1 in 68,000 in Lebanon and the highest prevalence is 1 in 54,478 in a small area of Sicily (Italy). It is believed that the populations with high prevalence have high-rate of consanguinity. The frequency of WSF1 mutation carrier is estimated to be 1 in 354 in the UK population and the disease is estimated to affect 1 out of 150 patient with juvenile-onset insulin-independent diabetes mellitus.

== Diagnosis ==
The diagnosis of Wolfram syndrome is multifaceted, involving clinical evaluation, genetic testing, laboratory investigations, and imaging studies. Clinical evaluation typically begins with a detailed medical history and physical examination, where patients often present with juvenile-onset diabetes mellitus followed by progressive optic atrophy, a condition where the optic nerves, which connect the eyes to the brain, deteriorate over time, leading to vision loss. There is increased suspicion when diabetes is diagnosed in children under 16. More evidence shows that Wolfram syndrome varies in how it appears.

The syndrome can present with various symptoms. In addition to diabetes and optic atrophy, the patient may exhibit diabetes insipidus, a condition where the kidneys cannot retain water, leading to frequent urination and excessive thirst. They might also have sensorineural hearing loss, which is a type of hearing loss caused by damage to the inner ear or the nerves that connect the ear to the brain. Neurological abnormalities such as ataxia (lack of muscle coordination) or myoclonus (sudden, involuntary muscle jerks) may also be observed. The progression of symptoms, starting with type 1 diabetes and subsequent vision loss within the first decade of life, is a critical diagnostic clue.

Imaging studies are essential for understanding the extent of brain and optic nerve damage in Wolfram syndrome. Magnetic resonance imaging (MRI) can show significant shrinkage of the brain stem and cerebellum, region of the brain in motor control and coordination. These change can resemble changes seen in other neurodegenerative disorders, which are diseases that involve the progressive loss of structure or function of neurons, including death of neurons. Additionally, areas of the pons, part of the brainstem, may show increased signal intensity on T2-weighted images, indicating potential damage or changes in tissue composition. The connections between the cerebellum and the brainstem (middle cerebellar peduncles) can also exhibit atrophy, consistent with Wolfram syndrome. Changes in the optic radiations, which are the pathways transmitting visual information from the eyes to the brain, can be detected, aligning with the optic atrophy characteristic of Wolfram syndrome. Furthermore, the absence of the typical T1 hyperintensity in the posterior pituitary lobe suggests a lack of vasopressin-containing neurons, often linked with diabetes insipidus, another symptom of Wolfram syndrome. Optical coherence tomography (OCT) is used to measure retinal nerve fiber layer thickness, aiding in the assessment of optic atrophy and monitoring disease progression.

Nowadays, genetic testing is used commonly to confirm the diagnosis of Wolfram syndrome. Initially, people with hereditary optic neuropathy who tested negative for mutation in the common optic neuropathy genes OPA1, OPA3 and LHON were selected for further genetic testing for WS. The primary genetic lotus associated with this syndrome is WFS1, and Sanger sequencing of this gene typically confirms the diagnosis. Most patient exhibit recessive mutation in WFS1, meaning they inherited two copies of the mutated genes, one from each parents. However, some dominant mutation, such as H313Y, have been identified, where one copy of the mutated gene can cause the disorder. These dominant mutations are often linked to low-frequency sensorineural hearing loss, which affects the ability to hear low-pitched sounds. Additionally, there have been recent discoveries of autosomal dominant diabetes, where diabetes is inherited in a dominant manner, in patients with WFS1 mutations. Interpreting genetic testing results requires specialized knowledge due to the complexity of the mutation.

Detailed family history is important as WS2 inherited in an autosomal recessive manner, and genetic counseling is recommended for affected individuals and their families to understand the inheritance pattern, risks to other family members, and reproductive options. A minority of patients have recessive mutation in the CISD2 gene, and for those without WFS1 mutations, sequencing of CISD2 is conducted. Efforts are underway to develop diagnosis methods based on exome (sequencing all the protein-coding regions of the genes) and genome sequencing (sequencing the entire genetic code) for Wolfram syndrome and related disorder.

Other diagnostic tools include audiological tests to identify sensorineural hearing loss, a common feature of Wolfram syndrome, and psychiatric evaluations to address cognitive or behavioral issues arising from neurodegenerative nature of the disease. Audiological tests help assess the extent of hearing loss and guide interventions like hearing aids or other assistive devices. Psychiatric evaluations are important because the neurological aspects of Wolfram syndrome can lead to cognitive decline or behavioral changes, which require appropriate management and support.

== Treatment ==
There is no known direct treatment. Current treatment efforts focus on managing the complications of Wolfram syndrome. Intranasal or oral desmopressin has been shown to improve symptoms for the treatment of diabetes insipidus caused by Wolfram syndrome. Patients with Wolfram syndrome experiencing hearing loss have benefited from the use of cochlear implants and hearing aids. While there are no therapies currently available to slow the progression of neurological manifestations, swallowing therapy and esophagomyotomy have been shown to be useful in alleviating some of the neurological symptoms. Anticholinergic medications, clean intermittent catheterizations, electrical stimulation, and physiotherapy have been shown to be effective at managing urological abnormalities due to Wolfram syndrome such as neurogenic bladder and upper urinary tract dilation.

While there are no direct treatments, many therapies are currently being investigated for their efficacy at treating Wolfram syndrome. Gene and regenerative therapies are currently being studied for their efficacy in replacing damaged tissues due to Wolfram syndrome, such as pancreatic β-cells, neuronal, and retinal cells.

WFS1 mutations cause proteins in the ER to fold improperly, leading to ER stress. ER stress stimulates the unfolded protein response (UPR), which causes cell apoptosis for pancreatic β-cells. Chemical chaperones are being investigated for their effect on reducing the UPR response and thus delaying disease progression by preventing cell death. The FDA has approved 4-phenylbutyric acid (PBA) and tauroursodeoxycholic acid (TUDCA) as chemical chaperones to reduce ER stress to delay neurodegeneration in patients with Wolfram syndrome. As of 2023, sodium valproate—an anti-epileptic drug—is being investigated as a therapy for Wolfram syndrome due to studies showing its ability to inhibit ER stress-induced apoptosis, reducing neurodegeneration. Liraglutide—a glucagon-like peptide-1 receptor (GLP 1-R) agonist—has been hypothesized to be an effective therapy, as it has been shown to improve diabetes mellitus, reduce cell death due to ER stress, reduce neuroinflammation, protect retinal ganglion cell death, and prevent optic nerve degeneration. Dipeptidyl peptidase-4 (DPP-4) inhibitors have also been hypothesized to be efficacious in the treatment of Wolfram syndrome due to their ability to activate GLP 1-R, similar to liraglutide. However, the efficacy and safety of using liraglutide and DPP-4 inhibitors for the treatment of Wolfram syndrome has not been well studied yet.

ER calcium levels have also been identified as a target for Wolfram syndrome therapy. WFS1 mutations increase cytosolic calcium, leading to the activation of cysteine proteases known as calpains. Increased calpains activation is associated which cell death. As of 2021, dantrolene sodium—a medication indicated for the treatment of malignant hyperthermia and muscle spasms—was being investigated in patients with Wolfram syndrome in a phase 2 clinical trial.

== Prognosis ==
Wolfram Syndrome prognosis is very poor with a median mortality rate of 65% before the age of 35 (age range 25–39). The two main reasons for death in people with Wolfram syndrome are central respiratory failure due to severe neurological disability and renal failure secondary to infections. Currently, there is no effective treatment that can delay or reverse the progression of the disease.

== See also ==
- WFS1
- Chromosome 4 disorders
- Nonsyndromic deafness
- List of rare diseases
- Wolfram-like syndrome
