= ErSO =

Identifiers
- IUPAC name: (3R)-3-(4-hydroxyphenyl)-3-[4-(trifluoromethoxy)phenyl]-7-(trifluoromethyl)-1H-indol-2-one
- CAS Number: 2407860-35-7
- PubChem CID: 149494442
- ChemSpider: 114935523
- ChEMBL: ChEMBL5266426

Chemical and physical data
- Formula: C_{22}H_{13}F_{6}NO_{3}
- Molar mass: 453.340 g·mol^{−1}
- 3D model (JSmol): Interactive image
- SMILES: C1=CC2=C(C(=C1)C(F)(F)F)NC(=O)[C@]2(C3=CC=C(C=C3)O)C4=CC=C(C=C4)OC(F)(F)F
- InChI: InChI=1S/C22H13F6NO3/c23-21(24,25)17-3-1-2-16-18(17)29-19(31)20(16,12-4-8-14(30)9-5-12)13-6-10-15(11-7-13)32-22(26,27)28/h1-11,30H,(H,29,31)/t20-/m1/s1; Key:ZFSRXAHDJSCEDS-HXUWFJFHSA-N

ErSO is an experimental anticancer drug which induces the unfolded protein response. In tests on mice it was effective at eliminating xenografts of human breast cancer cell lines. While it is at an early developmental stage and this particular molecule may not be developed for medical use, it represents an important proof of concept for inducers of unfolded protein response as a novel class of anti-cancer drugs.
