= Megalocornea-intellectual disability syndrome =

- Other names: Neuhauser syndrome
- Specialty: Medical genetics
- Symptoms: Ocular and intellect symptoms
- Usual onset: Birth
- Duration: Lifelong
- Causes: Genetic mutation
- Prevention: none
- Prognosis: Medium
- Frequency: very rare, only 24 cases have been described in medical literature
- Deaths: -

Megalocornea-intellectual disability syndrome, also known as Neuhauser syndrome, is a very rare genetic disorder which is characterized by megalocornea, hypotonia from birth, variable intellectual disabilities, psychomotor delays, developmental delays, and facial dysmorphisms such as round face, frontal bossing, antimongoloid slants of the eyes, epicanthal fold, large, low-set ears, broad nasal bridge, nostril anteversion, and increased length of the upper lip. According to OMIM, only 24 cases have been described in medical literature.
