= Invagination =

Process in embryonic development

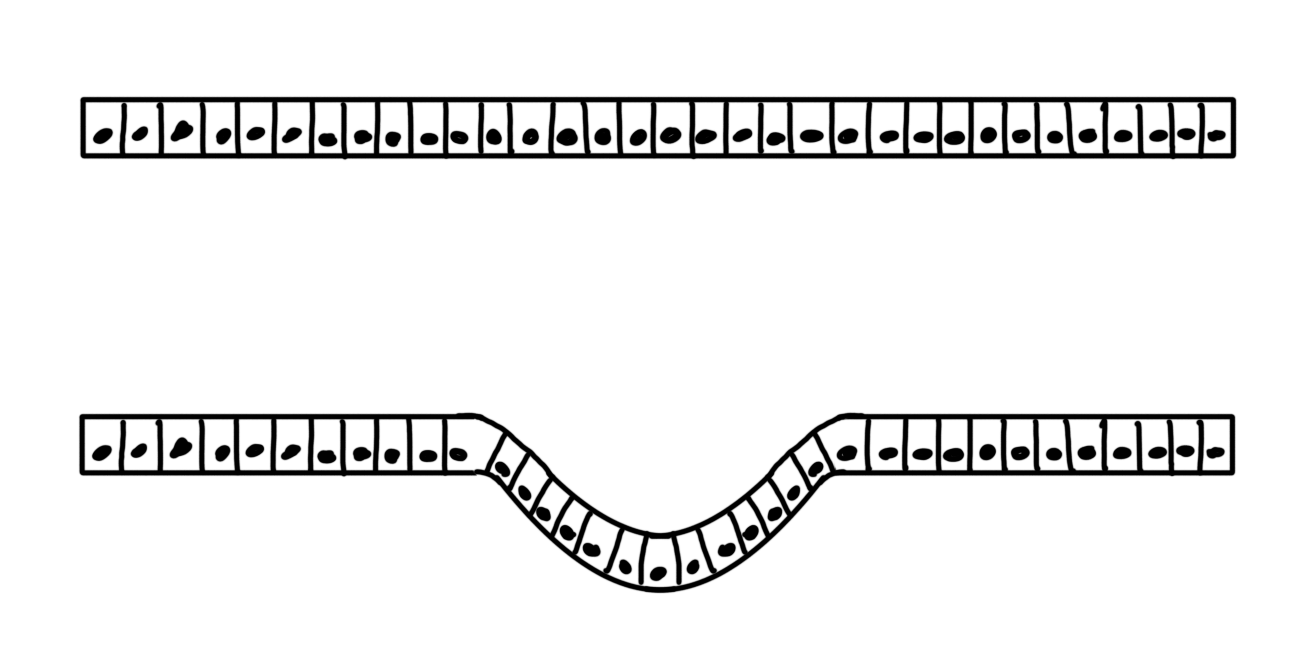
A sheet of cells undergoing invagination

Invagination is the process of a surface folding in on itself to form a cavity, pouch or tube. In developmental biology, invagination of epithelial sheets occurs in many contexts during embryonic development. Invagination is critical for making the primitive gut during gastrulation in many organisms, forming the neural tube in vertebrates, and in the morphogenesis of countless organs and sensory structures. Models of invagination that have been most thoroughly studied include the ventral furrow in Drosophila melanogaster, neural tube formation, and gastrulation in many marine organisms. The cellular mechanisms of invagination vary from one context to another but at their core they involve changing the mechanics of one side of a sheet of cells such that this pressure induces a bend in the tissue.

The term, originally used in embryology, has been adopted in other disciplines as well.

== History ==
The process of tissue invagination has fascinated scientists for over a century and a half. Since the beginning, scientists have tried to understand the process of invagination as a mechanical process resulting from forces acting in the embryo. For example, the Swiss biologist Wilhelm His, observing the invagination of the chick neural tube, experimented with modeling this process using sheets of different materials and suggested that pushing forces from the lateral edges of the neural plate might drive its invagination. Scientists throughout the next century have speculated on the mechanisms of invagination, often making models of this process using either physical analogs, or, especially in recent years, mathematical and computational modeling.

== Cellular mechanisms ==
Invagination can be driven by a number of mechanisms at the cellular level. Regardless of the force-generating mechanism that causes the bending of the epithelium, most instances of invagination result in a stereotypical cell shape change. At the side of the epithelium exposed to the environment (the apical side), the surface of cells shrinks, and at the side of the cell in contact with the basement membrane (the basal side), the cell surfaces expand. Thus, cells become wedge-shaped. As these cells change shape, the tissue bends in the direction of the apical surface. In many–– though not all––cases, this process involves active constriction of the apical surface by the actin-myosin cytoskeleton. Furthermore, while most invagination processes involve shrinking of the apical surface, there have been cases observed where the opposite happens - the basal surface constricts and the apical surface expands, such as in optic cup morphogenesis and formation of the midbrain-hindbrain boundary in zebrafish.

=== Apical constriction ===
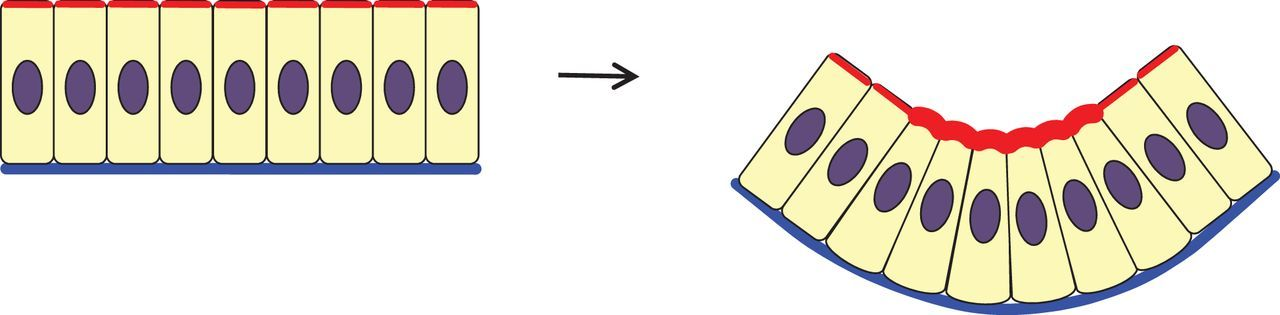
Apical constriction leading to invagination of a monolayer of cells

Apical constriction is an active process that results in the shrinkage of the apical side of the cell. This causes the cell shape to change from a column or cube-shaped cell to become wedge-shaped. Apical constriction is powered by the activity of the proteins actin and myosin interacting in a complex network known as the actin-myosin cytoskeleton. Myosin, a motor protein, generates force by pulling filaments of actin together. Myosin activity is regulated by the phosphorylation of one of its subunits, myosin regulatory light chain. Thus, kinases such as Rho-associated coiled-coil kinase (ROCK), which phosphorylate myosin, as well as phosphatases, which dephosphorylate myosin, are regulators of actomyosin contraction in cells.

The arrangement of actin and myosin in the cell cortex and the way they generate force can vary across contexts. Classical models of apical constriction in embryos and epithelia in cell culture showed that actin-myosin bundles are assembled around the circumference of the cell in association with adherens junctions between cells. Contraction of the actin-myosin bundles thus results in a constriction of the apical surface in a process that has been likened to the tightening of a purse string. More recently, in the context of a cultured epithelium derived from the mouse organ of Corti, it has also been shown that the arrangement of the actin and myosin around the cell circumerence is similar to a muscle sarcomere, where there are a repeating units of myosin connected to antiparallel actin bundles. In other cells, a network of myosin and actin in the middle of the apical surface can also generate apical constriction. For example, in cells of the Drosophila ventral furrow, the organization of actin and myosin is analogous to a muscle sarcomere arranged radially. In some contexts, a less clearly organized “cortical flow” of actin and myosin can also generate contraction of the apical surface.

=== Basal relaxation ===
To maintain a constant cell volume during apical constriction, cells must either change their height or expand the basal surface of their cells. While the process of basal relaxation has been less thoroughly studied, in some cases it has been directly observed that the process of apical constriction occurs alongside an active disassembly of the actin-myosin network at the basal surface of the cell, allowing the basal side of the cell to expand. For example, this has been observed in the Drosophila ventral furrow invagination and the formation of the otic placode in the chicken.

=== Changes in cell height ===
Invagination also often involves, and can be driven by, changes in cell height. When apical constriction occurs, this can lead to elongation of cells to maintain constant cell volume, and consequently a thickening of the epithelium. However, shortening of cells along the apical-basal axis can also help deepen the pit formed during invagination. Active changes in cell shape to cause cell shortening have been shown to contribute to invagination in a few cases. For example, in the Drosophila leg epithelium, apoptotic cells shrink and pull on the apical surface of the epithelium via an apical-basal cable made up of actin and myosin. In the invagination that occurs in ascidian gastrulation, cells first undergo apical constriction and then change their shape to become rounder ––and thus shorter along the apical-basal axis––which is responsible for the completion of the invagination movement. During cell division, cells also naturally take on a rounded morphology. The rapid drop in cell height caused by rounding of cells during mitosis has also been implicated in invagination of the Drosophila tracheal placode.

=== Supracellular cables ===
Supracellular actomyosin cables are structures of actin and myosin that align between cells next to each other and are connected by cell junctions. These cables play many roles in morphogenesis during embryonic development, including invagination. Rather than solely relying on apical constriction of individual cells, invagination can be driven by compressive forces from this cable contracting around the site of invagination, such as in the case of salivary gland invagination in Drosophila. In neural tube formation in the chick embryo, rows of supracellular cables stretching across the site of invagination help pull the tissue together to facilitate bending into a tube.

== Notable examples ==
=== Drosophila ventral furrow ===
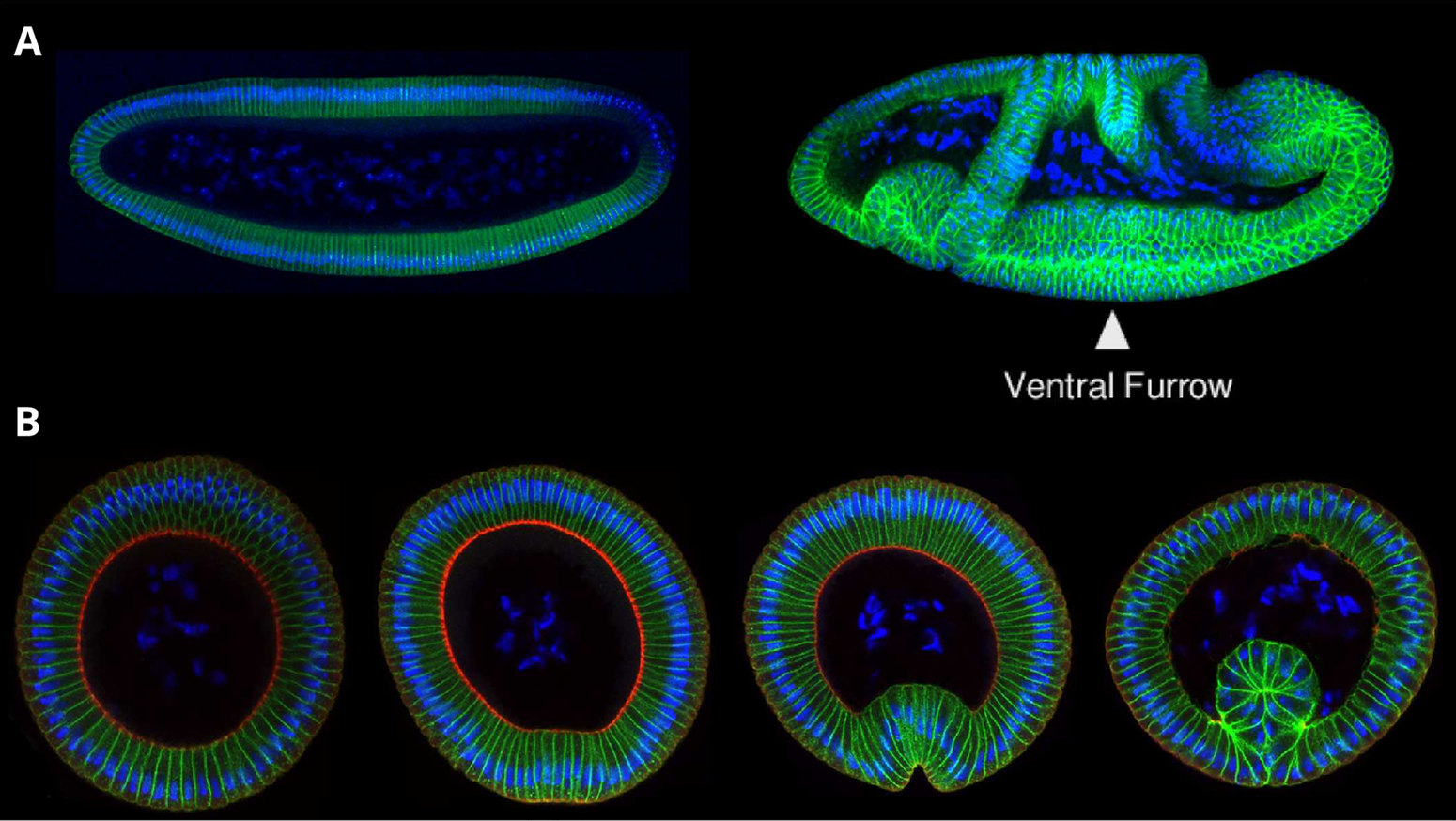
Formation of the ventral furrow in a Drosophila embryo. Cell nuclei (blue), membranes (green), and myosin (red) are stained.

One of the most well studied models of invagination is the ventral furrow in Drosophila melanogaster. The formation of this structure is one of the first major cell movements in Drosophila gastrulation. In this process, the prospective mesoderm––the region of cells along the ventral midline of the embryo––folds inwards to form the ventral furrow. This furrow eventually pinches off and becomes a tube inside the embryo and ultimately flattens to form a layer of tissue underneath the ventral surface.

Ventral furrow formation is driven by apical constriction of the future mesoderm cells, which first flatten along the apical surface and then contract their apical membranes. The classical models for how apical constriction worked in this context were based on the “purse-string” mechanism where an actin-myosin band around the circumference of the apical cell surface contracts. However, more recent investigations have revealed that, while there is a circumferential band of actin associated with cell junctions on the side of cells, it is actually an actin-myosin network arranged radially across the apical surface that powers apical constriction. This structure acts like a radial version of a muscle sarcomere. Force generated by myosin results in contraction towards the center of the cell. The cells do not contract continuously but rather have pulsed contractions. In between contractions, the actin network around the circumference of the cell helps stabilize the reduced size of the cell, allowing for a progressive decrease in size of the apical surface. In addition to apical constriction, adhesion between cells through adherens junctions is critical for transforming these individual cell-level contractions into a deformation of a whole tissue.

Genetically, formation of the ventral furrow relies on the activity of the transcription factors twist and snail, which are expressed in the prospective ventral mesoderm before furrow formation. Downstream of twist is the Fog signaling pathway, which controls the changes that occur in the apical domain of cells.

=== Neural tube formation ===
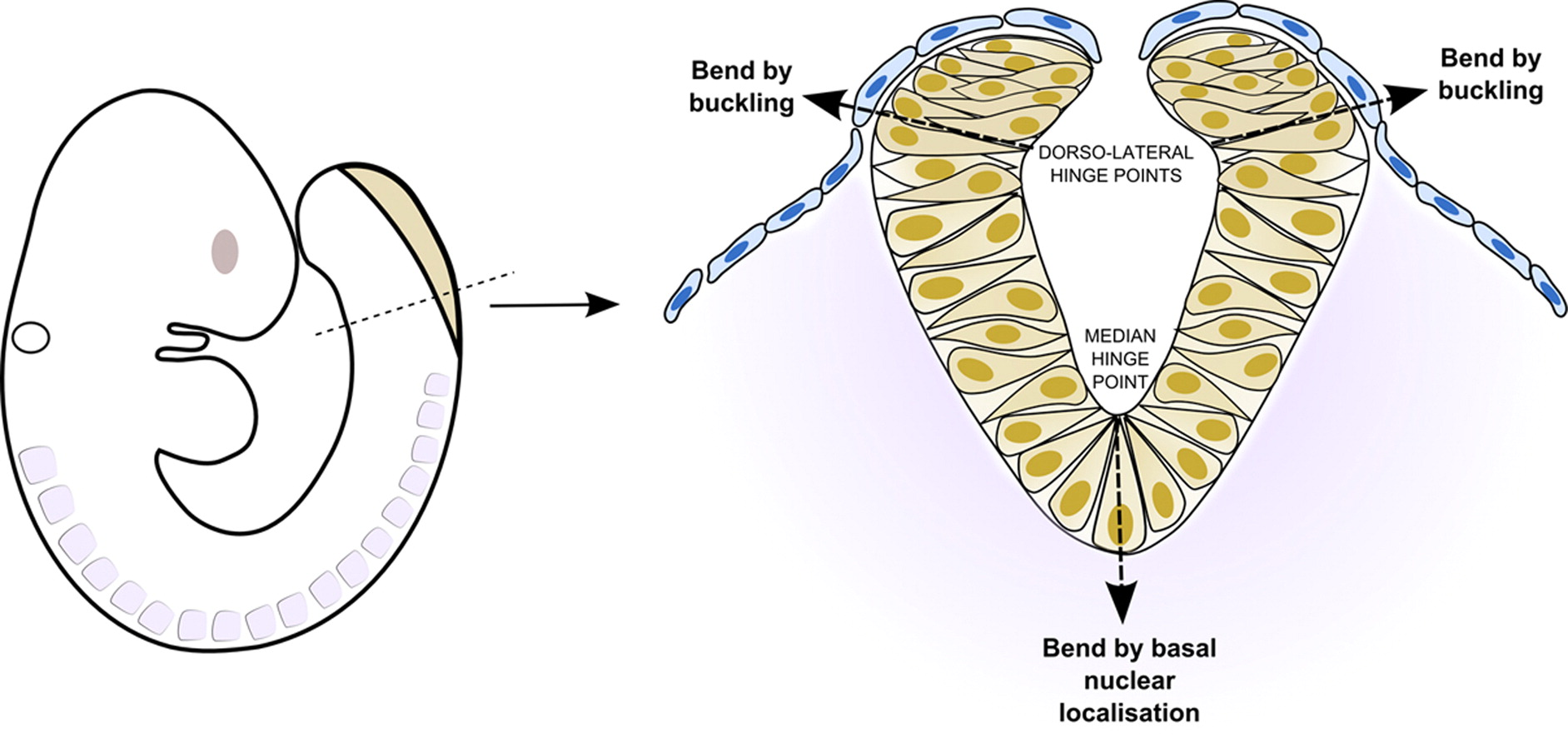
Cartoon of neural tube formation in a mouse embryo, showing the median hinge point and points of tissue buckling along the sides

Scientists have studied the process of neural tube formation in vertebrate embryos since the late 1800s. Across vertebrate groups including amphibians, reptiles, birds, and mammals, the neural tube (the embryonic precursor of the spinal cord) forms through the invagination of the neural plate into a tube, known as primary neurulation. In fish (and in some contexts in other vertebrates), the neural tube can also be formed by a non-invagination-mediated process known as secondary neurulation. While some differences exist in the mechanism of primary neurulation between vertebrate species, the general process is similar. Neurulation involves the formation of a medial hinge point at the middle of the neural plate, which is where tissue bending is initiated. The cells at the medial hinge point become wedge shaped. In some contexts, such as in Xenopus frog embryos, this cell shape change appears to be due to apical constriction. However, in chickens and mice, bending at this hinge point is mediated by a process called basal wedging, rather than apical constriction. In this case, the cells are so thin that the movement of the nucleus to the basal side of the cell causes a bulge in the basal part of the cell. This process may be regulated by how the cell divisions take place. Contractions of actin-myosin cables are also important for the invagination of the neural plate. Supracellular actin cables stretching across the neural plate help pull the tissue together (see § Supracellular cables). Furthermore, forces pushing into the neural plate from the adjacent tissue also may play a role in the folding of the neural plate.

=== Sea urchin gastrulation ===
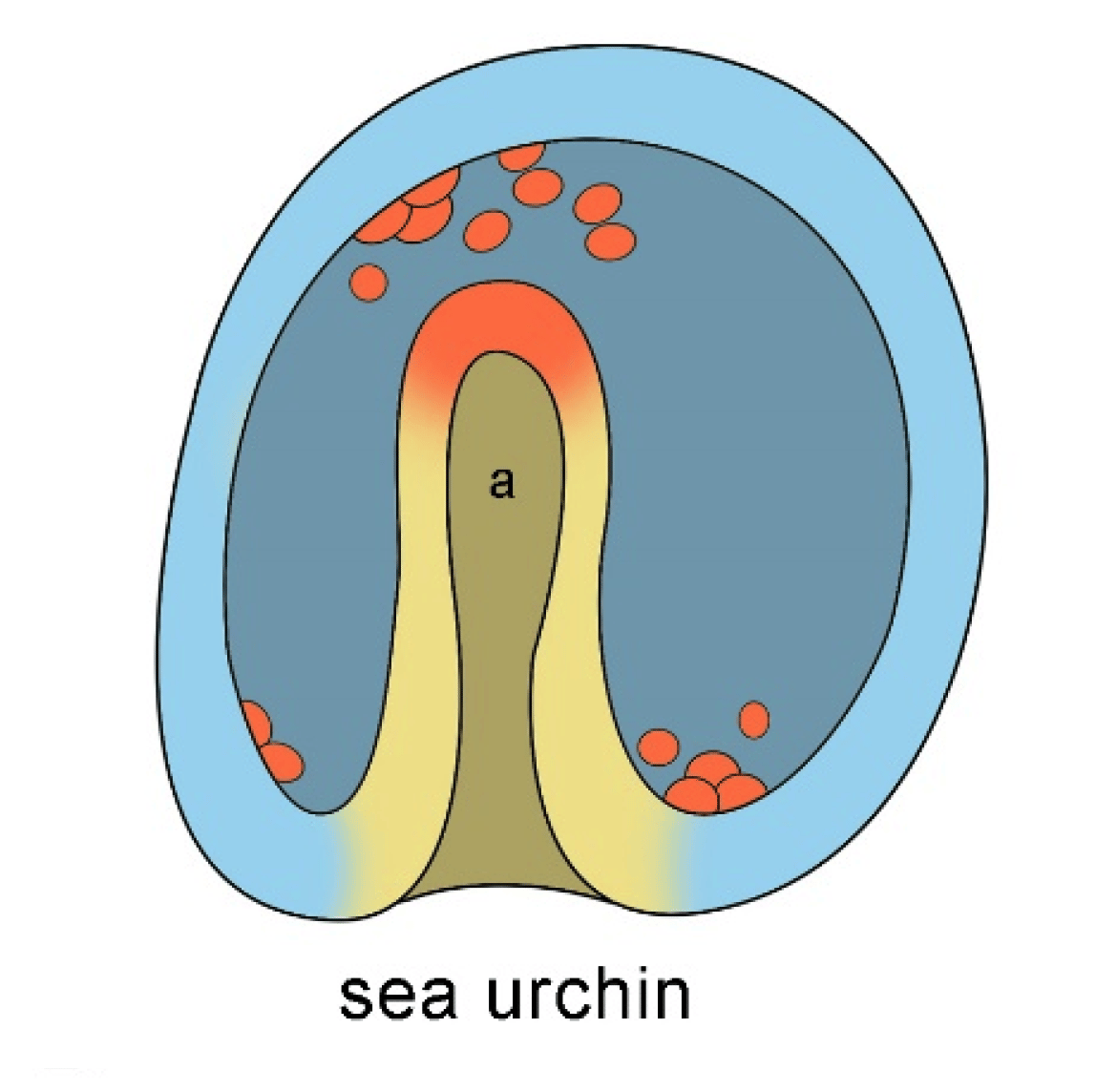
Invagination of the archenteron during sea urchin gastrulation

Sea urchin gastrulation is another classic model for invagination in embryology. One of the early gastrulation movements in sea urchins is the invagination of a region of cells at the vegetal side of the embryo (vegetal plate) to become the archenteron, or future gut tube. There are multiple stages of archenteron invagination: a first stage where the initial folding in of tissue occurs, a second stage where the archenteron elongates, and in some species a third stage where the archenteron contacts the other side of the cell cavity and finishes its elongation.

Apical constriction occurs in archenteron invagination, with a ring of cells called “bottle cells” in the center of the vegetal plate becoming wedge-shaped. However, invagination does not seem to be solely driven by the apical constriction of bottle cells, as inhibiting actin polymerization or removing bottle cells does not fully block invagination. Several other mechanisms have been proposed to be involved in the process, including a role for extraembryonic extracellular matrix. In this model, there are two layers of extracellular matrix at the apical surface of cells made of different proteins. When cells from the vegetal plate secrete a molecule (chondroitin sulfate proteoglycan) that is highly water absorbent into the inner layer, this causes the layer to swell, making the tissue buckle inwards. Several genetic pathways have been implicated in this process. Wnt signaling through the non-canonical planar cell polarity pathway has been shown to be important, with one of its downstream targets being the small GTPase RhoA. FGF signaling also plays a role in invagination.

=== Amphioxus gastrulation ===
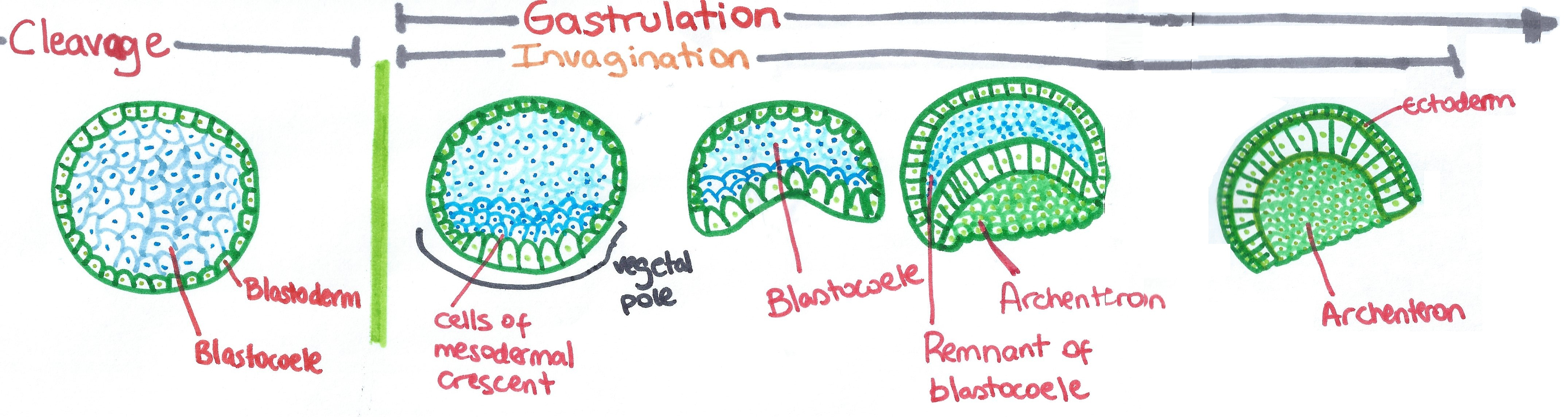
Invagination process in an amphioxus

The invagination in amphioxus is the first cell movement of gastrulation. This process was first described by Conklin. During gastrulation, the blastula will be transformed by the invagination. The endoderm folds towards the inner part and thus the blastocoel transforms into a cup-shaped structure with a double wall. The inner wall is now called the archenteron; the primitive gut. The archenteron will open to the exterior through the blastopore. The outer wall will become the ectoderm, later forming the epidermis and nervous system.

=== Tunicate gastrulation ===
In tunicates, invagination is the first mechanism that takes place during gastrulation. The four largest endoderm cells induce the invagination process in the tunicates. Invagination consists of the internal movements of a sheet of cells (the endoderm) based on changes in their shape. The blastula of the tunicates is a little flattened in the vegetal pole making a change of shape from a columnar to a wedge shape. Once the endoderm cells were invaginated, the cells will keep moving beneath the ectoderm. Later, the blastopore will be formed and with this, the invagination process is complete. The blastopore will be surrounded by the mesoderm by all sides.

== Other forms of invagination ==
=== Biology ===
- The inner membrane of a mitochondrion invaginates to form cristae, thus providing a much greater surface area to accommodate the protein complexes and other participants that produce adenosine triphosphate (ATP).
- Invagination occurs during endocytosis and exocytosis when a vesicle forms within the cell and the membrane closes around it.
- Invagination of a part of the intestine into another part is called intussusception.

=== Geology ===
In geology, invagination is used to describe a deep depression of strata. Used by Donald L. Baars in "The Colorado Plateau".

== See also ==
- Epithelium
- Apical constriction
- Gastrulation
- Neurulation
- Morphogenesis
- Muffing
