= CDGSH iron sulfur domain =

Protein domain

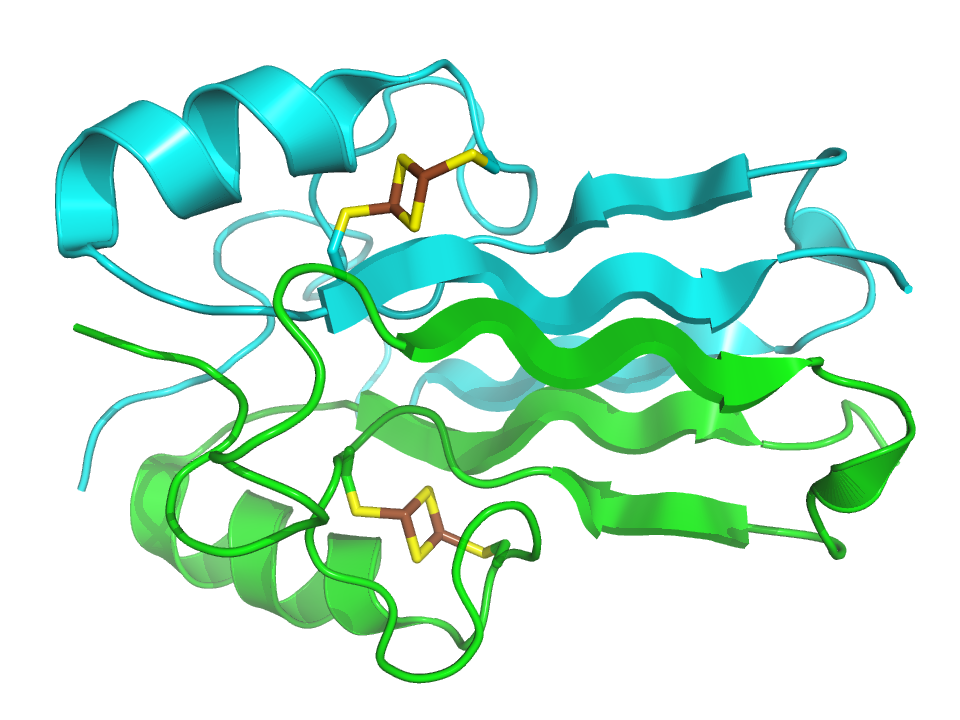
- Crystallographic structure (PDB: 2QH7) of the CDGSH-type domain 1 dimer (green and cyan cartoon) complexed with iron (brown) and sulfur (yellow) Fe-S clusters.

Identifiers
- Symbol: CDGSH
- Pfam: PF10660
- InterPro: IPR019610
- Membranome: 212
Available protein structures:
- Pfam: structures / ECOD
- PDB: RCSB PDB; PDBe; PDBj
- PDBsum: structure summary

CDGSH iron sulfur domain 1

Identifiers
- Symbol: CISD1
- Alt. symbols: C10orf70, ZCD1
- NCBI gene: 55847
- HGNC: 30880
- PDB: 2QH7
- RefSeq: NM_018464
- UniProt: Q9NZ45

Other data
- Locus: Chr. 10 q21.3
Search for
- Structures: Swiss-model
- Domains: InterPro

CDGSH iron sulfur domain 2

Identifiers
- Symbol: CISD2
- Alt. symbols: ZCD2
- NCBI gene: 493856
- HGNC: 24212
- RefSeq: NM_001008388
- UniProt: Q7Z3D5

Other data
- Locus: Chr. 4 q24
Search for
- Structures: Swiss-model
- Domains: InterPro

CDGSH iron sulfur domain 3

Identifiers
- Symbol: CISD3
- NCBI gene: 284106
- HGNC: 27578

Other data
- Locus: Chr. 17 q12

The CDGSH iron sulfur domain are a group of iron-sulfur (2Fe-2S) clusters and a unique 39 amino acid CDGSH domain [C-X-C-X2-(S/T)-X3-P-X-C-D-G-(S/A/T)-H].

The CDGSH iron sulfur domain 1 protein (also referred to as mitoNEET) is an integral membrane protein located in the outer mitochondrial membrane and whose function may be to transport iron into the mitochondria. Iron in turn is essential for the function of several mitochondrial enzymes.

The antidiabetic drug pioglitazone, in addition to binding to the nuclear receptor PPAR, also has been shown to bind mitoNEET with approximately equal affinity.
