= PERK inhibitors =

A PERK inhibitor is a small molecule compound that unlike any existing drug inhibits the expression of protein kinase RNA–like endoplasmic reticulum kinase. The (first such) inhibitor demonstrated the ability to halt brain cell death in mice with prion disease. It represents a major new pathway for drug research on brain illness, including Alzheimer's disease and Parkinson's disease. The compound works by blocking a faulty signal in brains afflicted by neurodegenerative diseases that shuts down the production of essential proteins, leaving brain cells unprotected and soon dead.

The compound can be administered orally and is able to cross the blood–brain barrier. The compound produced significant side effects, including weight loss and mild diabetes, caused by damage to the pancreas.

== PERK ==
The PERK enzyme plays a key role in activating the brain's defence mechanism. In mice with prion disease, inhibiting PERK restored translation of proteins that protect brain cells, renewed normal behaviours and prevented memory loss. Unfortunately, the treatment was not shown to extend survival in prion-infected treated mice.

== See also ==
- Unfolded protein response
