= Brefeldin A =

Names
- Preferred IUPAC name (1R,2E,6S,10E,11aS,13S,14aR)-1,13-Dihydroxy-6-methyl-1,6,7,8,9,11a,12,13,14,14a-decahydro-4H-cyclopenta[f][1]oxacyclotridecin-4-one
- Other names γ,4-Dihydroxy-2-(6-hydroxy-1-heptenyl)-4-cyclopentanecrotonic acid λ-lactone

Identifiers
| CAS Number | 20350-15-6 |
| 3D model (JSmol) | Interactive image |
| ChEBI | CHEBI:48080 |
| ChEMBL | ChEMBL19980 |
| ChemSpider | 4449949 |
| DrugBank | DB07348 |
| ECHA InfoCard | 100.127.053 |
| PubChem CID | 5287620 |
| UNII | XG0D35F9K6 |
| CompTox Dashboard (EPA) | DTXSID00880041 |
- InChI: InChI=1S/C16H24O4/c1-11-5-3-2-4-6-12-9-13(17)10-14(12)15(18)7-8-16(19)20-11/h4,6-8,11-15,17-18H,2-3,5,9-10H2,1H3/b6-4+,8-7+/t11-,12+,13-,14+,15+/m0/s1 Key: KQNZDYYTLMIZCT-KQPMLPITSA-N; InChI=1/C16H24O4/c1-11-5-3-2-4-6-12-9-13(17)10-14(12)15(18)7-8-16(19)20-11/h4,6-8,11-15,17-18H,2-3,5,9-10H2,1H3/b6-4+,8-7+/t11-,12+,13-,14+,15+/m0/s1 Key: KQNZDYYTLMIZCT-KQPMLPITBH
- SMILES: O=C/1O[C@H](CCC/C=C/[C@H]2[C@H]([C@H](O)/C=C\1)C[C@@H](O)C2)C

Properties
| Chemical formula | C_{16}H_{24}O_{4} |
| Molar mass | 280.36 g/mol |
| Appearance | White to off-white crystalline powder |
| Melting point | 204 to 205 °C (399 to 401 °F; 477 to 478 K) |
- Except where otherwise noted, data are given for materials in their standard state (at 25 °C [77 °F], 100 kPa). verify (what is ?) Infobox references

Brefeldin A is a lactone antiviral produced by the fungus Penicillium brefeldianum. Brefeldin A inhibits protein transport from the endoplasmic reticulum to the golgi complex indirectly by preventing association of COP-I coat to the Golgi membrane. Brefeldin A was initially isolated with hopes to become an antiviral drug but is now primarily used in research to study protein transport.

== History ==
The compound gets its name from a species of anamorph fungus of the Penicillium genus known as Eupenicillium brefeldianum, though it is found in a variety of species that span several genera. It was first isolated from Penicillium decumbens in 1958 by V.L. Singleton who initially called it Decumbin. It was later identified as a metabolite by H.P. Siggs who then went on to identify the chemical structure of the compound in 1971. Since then several successful total synthesis methods have been described. Interest in researching brefeldin A was initially lacking due to poor antiviral activity. However, upon discovery of its mechanism involving disruption of protein transport by Takatsuki and Tamura in 1985 and the cytotoxic effects observed in certain cancer cell lines, research efforts were revitalized. It is currently used solely in research mainly as an assay tool for studying membrane traffic and vesicle transport dynamics between the endoplasmic reticulum and Golgi apparatus.

== Physical properties and storage information ==
Brefeldin A is found naturally as a white to off-white crystalline solid. It forms a clear colorless solution when dissolved. It is soluble in methanol (10 mg/mL), ethanol (5 mg/mL), DMSO (20 mg/mL), acetone, and ethyl acetate (1 mg/mL) without the aid of heating. It is poorly soluble in water (slightly miscible). It is sold commercially with a purity of 98% or greater. It is recommended that it be stored desiccate at −20 °C away from direct sunlight. Its suggested shelf life for use is 6 months as a solid and 1 month as a solution with tightly sealed storage at −20 °C. Since the compound is combustible, contamination with oxidizing agents should be avoided to prevent the risk of fire. Direct contact should be avoided as well.

== Mechanism of action ==
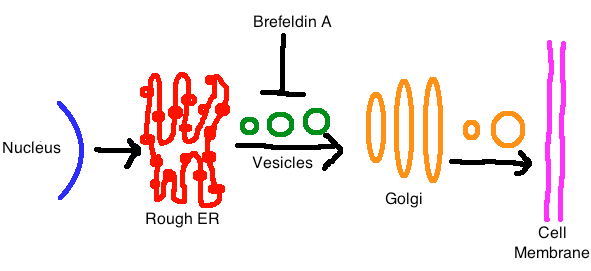
Brefeldin A inhibits vesicle formation and transport between the endoplasmic reticulum and the Golgi apparatus which ultimately results in collapse of the Golgi apparatus into the endoplasmic reticulum via membrane fusion.

In mammalian and yeast cells, the main target of brefeldin A appears to be a guanine nucleotide exchange factor (GEF) called GBF1. GBF1 is a member of the Arf family of GEFs which are recruited to membranes of the Golgi. It is responsible for the regulation of Arf1p GTPase. It does this through converting the inactive GDP-bound form of Arf1p to the active GTP-bound form. The nucleotide exchange occurs at the catalytic Sec7 domain of GBF1. Activated Arf1p then recruits coat protein β-COP, a subunit of the COP-I complex, to cargo-bound receptors on the membrane. Coat protein recruitment is necessary for proper vesicle formation and transport. Brefeldin A reversibly inhibits the function of GBF1 uncompetitively by binding to the complex it forms with GDP-bound Arf1p and preventing conversion to the GTP-bound form. The lack of active Arf1p prevents coat protein recruitment, which then ultimately induces the fusion of neighboring ER and Golgi membranes due to lack of vesicle formation. This is because lack of vesicle formation results in a buildup of SNARE proteins in the Golgi which would otherwise be bound to coat protein-coated vesicles and removed with the vesicles once they bud off. SNARE proteins mediate membrane fusion and it is postulated that the described SNARE build up in the Golgi increases the chances of aberrant fusion of the Golgi membrane with that of the ER. The collapse of the Golgi into the ER triggers activation of unfolded protein response (UPR) (or ER stress) which can result in apoptosis.

== Toxicity ==
The toxological effects of brefeldin A have not been studied extensively yet. Some animal LD_{50} values have been reported including 250 mg/kg in mice (intraperitoneal) and 275 mg/kg in rats (oral). Generally, antibiotic macrolides that share a similar macrocyclic lactone ring to that of brefeldin A have been shown to produce gastrointestinal discomfort as the most common side effect. Some macrolides have been shown to produce allergic reactions and though uncommon this possibility in the case of brefeldin A cannot be disregarded as of yet. The compound may bind to hemoglobin and inhibit oxygen uptake resulting in methemoglobinemia, a form of oxygen starvation, though this is not confirmed. Brefeldin A is not considered to be harmful from direct skin or eye exposure other than transient irritation. It may cause irritation of the respiratory system if inhaled.

== See also ==
- Unfolded protein response
- Endoplasmic reticulum stress response (ER stress)
