= Mizoribine =

Immunosuppressive drug

Clinical data
- Other names: 1-[(2R,3R,4S,5R)-3,4-dihydroxy-5-(hydroxymethyl)oxolan-2-yl]-5-hydroxyimidazole-4-carboxamide
- AHFS/Drugs.com: International Drug Names
- Routes of administration: Oral
- ATC code: none

Legal status
- Legal status: In general: ℞ (Prescription only)

Identifiers
- IUPAC name: 5-hydroxy-1-β-D-ribofuranosyl-1H-imidazole-4-carboxamide
- CAS Number: 50924-49-7
- PubChem CID: 104762
- ChemSpider: 94571
- UNII: 4JR41A10VP
- KEGG: D01392
- CompTox Dashboard (EPA): DTXSID8045777
- ECHA InfoCard: 100.164.876

Chemical and physical data
- Formula: C_{9}H_{13}N_{3}O_{6}
- Molar mass: 259.218 g·mol^{−1}
- 3D model (JSmol): Interactive image
- SMILES: C1=NC(=C(N1[C@H]2[C@@H]([C@@H]([C@H](O2)CO)O)O)O)C(=O)N
- InChI: InChI=1S/C9H13N3O6/c10-7(16)4-8(17)12(2-11-4)9-6(15)5(14)3(1-13)18-9/h2-3,5-6,9,13-15,17H,1H2,(H2,10,16)/t3-,5-,6-,9-/m1/s1; Key:HZQDCMWJEBCWBR-UUOKFMHZSA-N

Mizoribine (INN; MZB; trade name Bredinin) is an immunosuppressive drug. The compound was first observed in Tokyo, Japan, in 1971. It was first isolated from the fungus Penicillium brefeldianum. Mizoribine is an imidazole nucleoside that has been used in renal transplantation, and in steroid-resistant nephrotic syndrome, IgA nephropathy, lupus, as well as for adults with rheumatoid arthritis, lupus nephritis and other rheumatic diseases. MZB exerts its activity through selective inhibition of inosine monophosphate dehydrogenase and guanosine monophosphate synthetase, resulting in the complete inhibition of guanine nucleotide synthesis without incorporation into nucleotides. It arrests DNA synthesis in the S phase of cellular division. Thus, MZB has less toxicity than azathioprine, another immunosuppressant used for some of the same diseases.
