= Convergent extension =

Morphogenetic process

Convergent extension (CE), sometimes called convergence and extension (C&E), is the process by which the tissue of an embryo is restructured to converge (narrow) along one axis and extend (elongate) along a perpendicular axis by cellular movement.

== Example and explanation ==
An example of this process is where the anteroposterior axis (the axis drawn between the head and tail end of an embryo) becomes longer as the lateral tissues (those that make up the left and right sides of the embryo) move in towards the dorsal midline (the middle of the back of the animal). This process plays a crucial role in shaping the body plan during embryogenesis and occurs during gastrulation, neurulation, axis elongation, and organogenesis in both vertebrate and invertebrate embryos. In chordate animals, this process is utilized within a vast population of cells; from the smaller populations in the notochord of the sea squirt (ascidian) to the larger populations of the dorsal mesoderm and neural ectoderm of frogs (Xenopus) and fish. Many characteristics of convergent extension are conserved in the teleost fish, the bird, and very likely within mammals at the molecular, cellular, and tissue level.

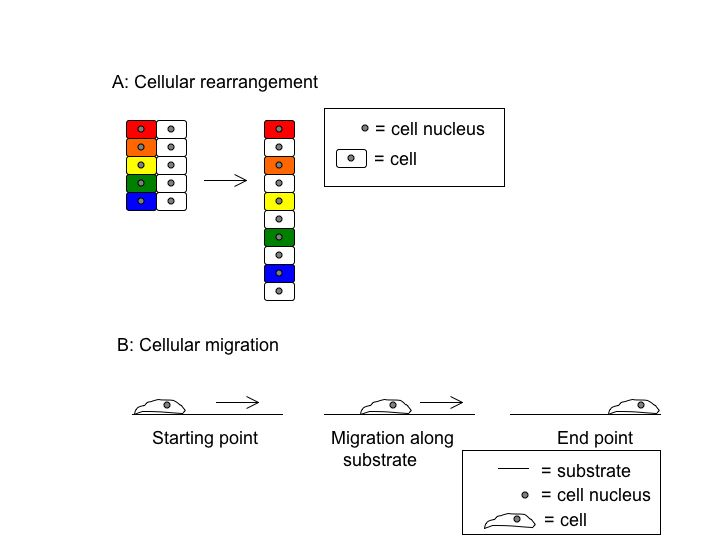
Figure 1. Morphogenic Movements (Adapted from)

== In amphibians and fish ==
Convergent extension has been primarily studied in frogs and fish due to their large embryo size and their development outside of a maternal host (in egg clutches in the water, as opposed to in a uterus). Within frogs and fish, however, there exist fundamental differences in how convergent extension is achieved. Frog embryogenesis utilizes cell rearrangement as the sole player of this process. Fish, on the other hand, utilize both cell rearrangement as well as directed migration (Fig. 1) . Cellular rearrangement is the process by which individual cells of a tissue rearrange to reshape the tissue as a whole, while cellular migration is the directed movement of a singular cell or small group of cells across a substrate such as a membrane or tissue.

Frog (Xenopus), as well as other amphibian, gastrulation serves as an excellent example of the role of convergent extension in embryogenesis. During gastrulation in frogs, the driving force of convergent extension is the morphogenic activity of the presumptive dorsal mesodermal cells; this activity is driven by the mesenchymal cells that lie beneath the presumptive mesodermal and neural tissues. These tissues exist within the involuting marginal zone (IMZ) of the embryo which lies between the vegetal endoderm and the posterior neural tissue. The IMZ is integral to gastrulation and R. Keller et al. eloquently exemplify the importance of convergent extension in Xenopus gastrulation. “…the IMZ, true to its name, involutes or rolls over the blastoporal lip and turns inside out. As it involutes, it converges along the mediolateral axis and extends along the future anterior-posterior axis of the notochordal and somitic mesoderm. Convergence and extension of these tissues squeezes the blastopore shut and simultaneously elongate the body axis. Elongation continues through the neurula and tailbud stages…As these involuted dorsal mesodermal tissues converge and extend on the inside of the gastrula, the presumptive posterior neural tissue converges and extends on the outside of the embryo, parallel to the underlying mesoderm, and then rolls up to form the neural tube, which later forms the hindbrain and spinal cord of the central nervous system". Should convergent extension be interrupted or incomplete, the resulting organism will have a short anteroposterior axis, wide notochord, and broad, open neural tube.

== Cellular mechanisms ==
The cellular signals required for convergent extension are not fully understood, however, it is known that the non-canonical Wnt signaling pathway plays an important role,. Current research is shedding light on the cellular mechanisms of convergent extension and recently the planar cell polarity (PCP) pathway was implicated in regulating the cell polarity of the factors involved in convergent extension. This is an interesting development as the PCP pathway is an integral and well-studied pathway in flies, but has classically been thought to be unemployed by vertebrates. In addition to the non-canonical Wnt and PCP pathways involvement in convergent extension, the down-regulation of certain cell-cell adhesion molecules, such as C-cadherin and fibronectin/integrin interactions, may also play a role. Reduction of the activity of these cell-cell adhesion molecules allows for cells undergoing convergent extension to move more freely. Consistent with a role for a reduction of cell-cell adhesion in convergent extension, when cell-cell adhesion is not reduced, convergent extension cannot occur.
