= GBF1 =

Protein-coding gene in the species Homo sapiens

Identifiers
- Aliases: GBF1, ARF1GEF, golgi brefeldin A resistant guanine nucleotide exchange factor 1, CMT2GG
- External IDs: OMIM: 603698; MGI: 1861607; GeneCards: GBF1

Gene location (Human)
Chr.	Chromosome 10 (human)
Band	10q24.32	Start	102,245,371 bp
Band	10q24.32	End	102,382,899 bp

Gene location (Mouse)
Chr.	Chromosome 19 (mouse)
Band	19|19 C3	Start	46,140,948 bp
Band	19|19 C3	End	46,274,949 bp
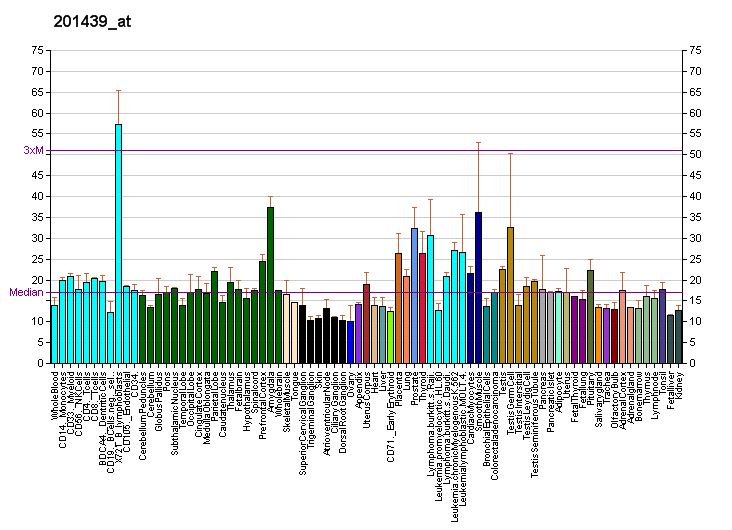
RNA expression pattern
Bgee	Human / Mouse (ortholog); Top expressed in: epithelium of colon; ventricular zone; anterior pituitary; sural nerve; stromal cell of endometrium; ganglionic eminence; right lobe of thyroid gland; apex of heart; mucosa of transverse colon; right hemisphere of cerebellum / Top expressed in: neural layer of retina; zygote; tail of embryo; lacrimal gland; secondary oocyte; genital tubercle; muscle of thigh; seminiferous tubule; molar; parotid gland; More reference expression data
BioGPS	More reference expression data
Gene ontology
Molecular function	phosphatidylinositol-3,5-bisphosphate binding; protein binding; guanyl-nucleotide exchange factor activity; phosphatidylinositol-3,4,5-trisphosphate binding; lipid binding
Cellular component	lipid droplet; Golgi membrane; trans-Golgi network; cell leading edge; peroxisome; cytoplasm; endoplasmic reticulum lumen; Golgi stack; mitochondrion; cytosol; Golgi apparatus; membrane; cis-Golgi network; endoplasmic reticulum-Golgi intermediate compartment
Biological process	Golgi disassembly; protein localization to endoplasmic reticulum tubular network; retrograde vesicle-mediated transport, Golgi to endoplasmic reticulum; protein transport; Golgi organization; viral process; regulation of mitotic cell cycle; endoplasmic reticulum-Golgi intermediate compartment organization; post-Golgi vesicle-mediated transport; establishment of monopolar cell polarity; protein localization to endoplasmic reticulum exit site; regulation of protein localization to cell surface; endoplasmic reticulum to Golgi vesicle-mediated transport; cell activation involved in immune response; protein localization to Golgi apparatus; neutrophil chemotaxis; reactive oxygen species biosynthetic process; retrograde transport, endosome to Golgi; Golgi to endosome transport; regulation of ARF protein signal transduction; COPI coating of Golgi vesicle; transport; regulation of molecular function
Sources:Amigo / QuickGO
Orthologs
Databases	NCBI: entry; OMA: entry
Species	Human	Mouse
Entrez	8729	107338
Ensembl	ENSG00000107862	ENSMUSG00000025224
UniProt	Q92538	n/a
RefSeq (mRNA)	NM_001199378; NM_001199379; NM_004193; NM_001377137; NM_001377138 NM_001377139; NM_001377140; NM_001377141; NM_001391922; NM_001391923; NM_001391924; NM_001391925; NM_001391926; NM_001391927; NM_001391928; NM_001391929; NM_001391930; NM_001391931	NM_178930
RefSeq (protein)	NP_001186307; NP_001186308; NP_004184	n/a
Location (UCSC)	Chr 10: 102.25 – 102.38 Mb	Chr 19: 46.14 – 46.27 Mb
PubMed search
- Wikidata
View/Edit Human	View/Edit Mouse

Golgi-specific brefeldin A-resistance guanine nucleotide exchange factor 1 is a protein that in humans is encoded by the GBF1 gene.
