= Penicillium brefeldianum =

Scientific classification
- Kingdom: Fungi
- Division: Ascomycota
- Class: Eurotiomycetes
- Order: Eurotiales
- Family: Aspergillaceae
- Genus: Penicillium
- Species: P. brefeldianum

Binomial name
- Penicillium brefeldianum Stolk & D.B. Scott 1967

Type strain
- CBS 235.81, FRR 0710, IFO 31731, IMI 216896, LCP 89.2573, LCP 89.2578, MUCL 38762, NBRC 31731, NRRL 710, QM 1872, Thom 5296

Synonyms
- Eupenicillium brefeldianum, Carpenteles brefeldianum

Species of fungus

Penicillium brefeldianum is an anamorph fungus species of the genus of Penicillium which produces brefeldin A a fungal metabolite.

== See also ==
- List of Penicillium species
