= Chordin-like 1 =

Protein-coding gene in humans

CHRDL1

Identifiers
- Aliases: CHRDL1, chordin-like 1, CHL, MGC1, MGCN, NRLN1, VOPT, dA141H5.1, chordin like 1
- External IDs: OMIM: 300350; MGI: 1933172; GeneCards: CHRDL1

Gene location (Human)
| Chr. | X chromosome (human) |
| Band | Xq23 | Start | 110,673,856 bp |
| Band | Xq23 | End | 110,795,819 bp |

Gene location (Mouse)
| Chr. | X chromosome (mouse) |
| Band | X|X F2 | Start | 142,068,670 bp |
| Band | X|X F2 | End | 142,177,258 bp |
RNA expression pattern
| Bgee | Human / Mouse (ortholog); Top expressed in: decidua; vena cava; parietal pleura; saphenous vein; urethra; pericardium; germinal epithelium; seminal vesicula; skin of hip; gastric mucosa / Top expressed in: sciatic nerve; epithelium of lens; white adipose tissue; ciliary body; vestibular sensory epithelium; iris; intercostal muscle; carotid body; lumbar spinal ganglion; subcutaneous adipose tissue; More reference expression data |
| BioGPS | n/a |
Orthologs
| Databases | NCBI: entry; OMA: entry |
| Species | Human | Mouse |
| Entrez | 91851 | 83453 |
| Ensembl | ENSG00000101938 | ENSMUSG00000031283 |
| UniProt | Q9BU40 | Q920C1 |
| RefSeq (mRNA) | NM_001143981; NM_001143982; NM_001143983; NM_145234 | NM_001114385; NM_031258; NM_001358592 |
| RefSeq (protein) | NP_001137453; NP_001137454; NP_001137455; NP_660277; NP_001354133 NP_001354134; NP_001354135; NP_001354136; NP_001354137; NP_001354138 | NP_001107857; NP_112548; NP_001345521 |
| Location (UCSC) | Chr X: 110.67 – 110.8 Mb | Chr X: 142.07 – 142.18 Mb |
| PubMed search |
- Wikidata
| View/Edit Human | View/Edit Mouse |

Chordin-like 1 is a protein that in humans is encoded by the CHRDL1 gene. Chordin-Like 1 (CHRDL1) is a structural glycoprotein that sits on the X chromosome and specifically encodes Venotropin, which is an antagonistic protein to bone morphogenic protein 4.

== Function ==
This gene encodes an antagonist of bone morphogenetic protein 4. The encoded protein may play a role in topographic retinotectal projection and in the regulation of retinal angiogenesis in response to hypoxia. Alternatively spliced transcript variants encoding different isoforms have been described.

CHRDL1 plays important roles in processes such as embryonic cell differentiation, osteogenesis, neurogenesis, tumor and metastasis suppression, and retinal formation. The highest expression of this gene is found in the anterior eye segment and retina as well as in the cerebellum and neocortex. In the neocortex, it peaks at the time of synapse maturation to allow for proper synaptic formation. Therefore, this gene is important in proper formation of the central nervous system and the eyes.

== Clinical significance ==
Mutations in CHRDL1 are associated to Neuhäuser Syndrome, X-linked megalocornea and central corneal thickness.

Mutations in this gene may cause a variety of effects on the aforementioned processes. One potential outcome of a CHRDL1 mutation is non-syndromic X-linked megalocornea (XMC) that results from either a missense, nonsense, or frameshift mutation of the gene. XMC is an enlargement of the anterior segments of the eye that may lead to other issues such as cataracts and glaucoma. Another potential outcome is carcinogenic formation. Since CHRDL1 is a tumor and metastasis suppressor, a mutation in this gene may lead to tumor cell formation. The most major effect a mutation could have is on synaptic stabilization. Since the gene limits synaptic plasticity, a mutation may cause issues in proper synapse maturation, leading to a variety of neurological disorders. There is currently a knockout model for this gene that shows disruption may cause altered synaptic events and reduced synaptic GluA2 AMPARs leading to increased plasticity.
