= XBP1 =

Protein-coding gene in the species Homo sapiens

Identifiers
- Aliases: XBP1, TREB5, XBP-1, XBP2, TREB-5, X-box binding protein 1
- External IDs: OMIM: 194355; MGI: 98970; GeneCards: XBP1

Gene location (Human)
Chr.	Chromosome 22 (human)
Band	22q12.1|22q12	Start	28,794,555 bp
Band	22q12.1|22q12	End	28,800,597 bp

Gene location (Mouse)
Chr.	Chromosome 11 (mouse)
Band	11 A1|11 3.61 cM	Start	5,470,659 bp
Band	11 A1|11 3.61 cM	End	5,475,893 bp
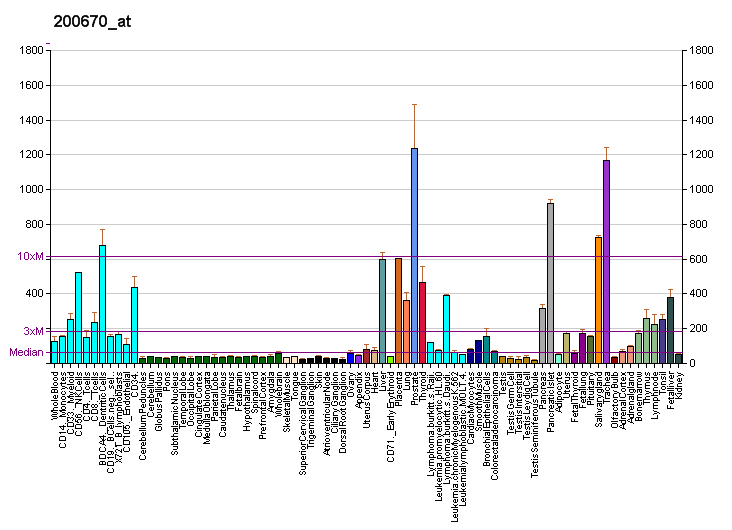
RNA expression pattern
Bgee	Human / Mouse (ortholog); Top expressed in: body of pancreas; trachea; islet of Langerhans; olfactory zone of nasal mucosa; right lobe of liver; bone marrow cell; tonsil; rectum; epithelium of bronchus; appendix / Top expressed in: lacrimal gland; parotid gland; seminal vesicula; submandibular gland; epithelium of stomach; gastrula; islet of Langerhans; right lung lobe; lobe of prostate; vestibular membrane of cochlear duct; More reference expression data
BioGPS	More reference expression data
Gene ontology
Molecular function	estrogen receptor binding; protein homodimerization activity; protease binding; protein binding; protein kinase binding; sequence-specific DNA binding; cis-regulatory region sequence-specific DNA binding; protein heterodimerization activity; chromatin DNA binding; ubiquitin protein ligase binding; DNA binding; DNA-binding transcription factor activity; RNA polymerase II transcription regulatory region sequence-specific DNA binding; DNA-binding transcription factor activity, RNA polymerase II-specific; RNA polymerase II cis-regulatory region sequence-specific DNA binding; identical protein binding
Cellular component	cytosol; membrane; integral component of membrane; nucleoplasm; integral component of endoplasmic reticulum membrane; endoplasmic reticulum membrane; cytoplasm; endoplasmic reticulum; nucleus
Biological process	positive regulation of MHC class II biosynthetic process; positive regulation of protein phosphorylation; negative regulation of endoplasmic reticulum unfolded protein response; positive regulation of immunoglobulin production; muscle organ development; vascular endothelial growth factor receptor signaling pathway; phosphatidylinositol 3-kinase signaling; apoptotic process; regulation of transcription, DNA-templated; regulation of protein stability; glucose homeostasis; transcription, DNA-templated; cell growth; positive regulation of endothelial cell apoptotic process; response to unfolded protein; fatty acid biosynthetic process; protein transport; positive regulation of TOR signaling; exocrine pancreas development; negative regulation of endoplasmic reticulum stress-induced intrinsic apoptotic signaling pathway; cell differentiation; positive regulation of autophagy; cellular response to laminar fluid shear stress; positive regulation of transcription from RNA polymerase II promoter in response to endoplasmic reticulum stress; positive regulation of B cell differentiation; negative regulation of transcription by RNA polymerase II; cellular response to fluid shear stress; organelle organization; regulation of autophagy; immune response; positive regulation of proteasomal protein catabolic process; positive regulation of plasma cell differentiation; positive regulation of T cell differentiation; positive regulation of endoplasmic reticulum unfolded protein response; positive regulation of histone methylation; lipid metabolism; epithelial cell maturation involved in salivary gland development; positive regulation of protein acetylation; positive regulation of ER-associated ubiquitin-dependent protein catabolic process; autophagy; multicellular organism development; ATF6-mediated unfolded protein response; IRE1-mediated unfolded protein response; intrinsic apoptotic signaling pathway in response to endoplasmic reticulum stress; epithelial cell maturation; cellular response to oxidative stress; cellular response to vascular endothelial growth factor stimulus; protein destabilization; cellular response to peptide hormone stimulus; positive regulation of transcription by RNA polymerase II; negative regulation of pathway-restricted SMAD protein phosphorylation; adipose tissue development; positive regulation of vascular associated smooth muscle cell migration; liver development; cellular triglyceride homeostasis; cholesterol homeostasis; negative regulation of transforming growth factor beta receptor signaling pathway; positive regulation of lactation; cellular response to amino acid stimulus; angiogenesis; cellular response to glucose starvation; response to insulin-like growth factor stimulus; negative regulation of ERK1 and ERK2 cascade; fatty acid homeostasis; positive regulation of vascular associated smooth muscle cell proliferation; positive regulation of hepatocyte proliferation; sterol homeostasis; cellular response to interleukin-4; positive regulation of protein kinase B signaling; ubiquitin-dependent protein catabolic process; positive regulation of fat cell differentiation; negative regulation of apoptotic process; endothelial cell proliferation; transcription by RNA polymerase II; positive regulation of cell population proliferation; negative regulation of myotube differentiation; positive regulation of cell migration; endoplasmic reticulum unfolded protein response; cellular response to nutrient; cellular response to insulin stimulus; response to endoplasmic reticulum stress; positive regulation of vascular wound healing; positive regulation of angiogenesis; neuron development; cellular response to lipopolysaccharide; cellular response to fructose stimulus; cellular response to glucose stimulus; positive regulation of transcription from RNA polymerase II promoter involved in unfolded protein response; cellular response to leukemia inhibitory factor; positive regulation of protein import into nucleus; regulation of cell growth
Sources:Amigo / QuickGO
Orthologs
Databases	NCBI: entry; OMA: entry
Species	Human	Mouse
Entrez	7494	22433
Ensembl	ENSG00000100219	ENSMUSG00000020484
UniProt	P17861	O35426
RefSeq (mRNA)	NM_005080; NM_001079539; NM_001393999; NM_001394000	NM_001271730; NM_013842
RefSeq (protein)	NP_001073007; NP_005071	NP_001258659; NP_038870
Location (UCSC)	Chr 22: 28.79 – 28.8 Mb	Chr 11: 5.47 – 5.48 Mb
PubMed search
- Wikidata
View/Edit Human	View/Edit Mouse

X-box binding protein 1, also known as XBP1, is a protein which in humans is encoded by the XBP1 gene. The XBP1 gene is located on chromosome 22 while a closely related pseudogene has been identified and localized to chromosome 5. The XBP1 protein is a transcription factor that regulates the expression of genes important to the proper functioning of the immune system and in the cellular stress response.

== Discovery ==
The X-box binding protein 1 (XBP1) is a transcription factor containing a bZIP domain. It was first identified by its ability to bind to the Xbox, a conserved transcriptional element in the promoter of the human leukocyte antigen (HLA) DR alpha.

== Function ==
=== MHC class II gene regulation ===
The expression of this protein is required for the transcription of a subset of class II major histocompatibility genes. Furthermore, XBP1 heterodimerizes with other bZIP transcription factors such as c-fos.

XBP1 expression is controlled by the cytokine IL-4 and the antibody IGHM. XBP1 in turn controls the expression of IL-6 which promotes plasma cell growth and of immunoglobulins in B lymphocytes.

=== Plasma cell differentiation ===
XBP1 is also essential for differentiation of plasma cells (a type of antibody secreting immune cell). This differentiation requires not only the expression of XBP1 but the expression of the spliced isoform of XBP1s. XBP1 regulates plasma cell differentiation independent of its known functions in the endoplasmic reticulum stress response (see below). Without normal expression of XBP1, two important plasma cell differentiation-related genes, IRF4 and Blimp1, are misregulated, and XBP1-lacking plasma cells fail to colonize their long-lived niches in the bone marrow and to sustain antibody secretion.

=== Eosinophil differentiation ===
XBP1 is required for eosinophil differentiation. Eosinophils lacking XBP1 exhibit defects in granule proteins.

=== Angiogenesis ===
XBP1 acts to regulate endothelial cell proliferation through growth factor pathways, leading to angiogenesis. Additionally, XBP1 protects endothelial cells from oxidative stress by interacting with HDAC3.

=== Viral replication ===
This protein has also been identified as a cellular transcription factor that binds to an enhancer in the promoter of the Human T-lymphotropic virus 1. The generation of XBP1s during plasma cell differentiation also seems to be the cue for Kaposi's sarcoma-associated herpesvirus and Epstein Barr virus reactivation from latency.

=== Endoplasmic reticulum stress response ===
XBP1 is part of the endoplasmic reticulum (ER) stress response. It is the major effector of the IRE1 branch of the unfolded protein response (UPR) in animal cells (a counterpart to yeast HAC1). Conditions that exceed capacity of the ER provoke ER stress and trigger the unfolded protein response (UPR). As a result, GRP78 is released from IRE1 to support protein folding. IRE1 oligomerises and activates its ribonuclease domain through auto (self) phosphorylation. Activated IRE1 catalyses the excision of a 26 nucleotide unconventional intron from ubiquitously expressed XBP1u mRNA, in a manner mechanistically similar to pre-tRNA splicing. Removal of this intron causes a frame shift in the XBP1 coding sequence resulting in the translation of a 376 amino acid, 40 kDa, XBP-1s isoform rather than the 261 amino acid, 33 kDa, XBP1u isoform. Moreover, the XBP1u/XBP1s ratio (XBP1-unspliced/XBP1-spliced ratio) correlates with the expression level of expressed proteins in order to adapt the folding capacity of the ER to the respective requirements.

== Clinical significance ==
Abnormalities in XBP1 lead to a heightened ER stress and subsequently causes a heightened susceptibility for inflammatory processes that may contribute to Alzheimer's disease. In the colon, XBP1 anomalies have been linked to Crohn's disease.

A single nucleotide polymorphism, C116G, in the promoter region of XBP1 has been examined for possible associations with personality traits. None were found. A 2023 review proposed that XBP1 may contribute to drug resistance in hepatocellular carcinoma through mechanisms involving DNA-damage repair, drug detoxification, inhibition of apoptosis, and adaptation to the tumor microenvironment.

== Interactions ==
XBP1 has been shown to interact with estrogen receptor alpha.

== See also ==
- Unfolded protein response
