= Megalocornea =

- Specialty: Ophthalmology

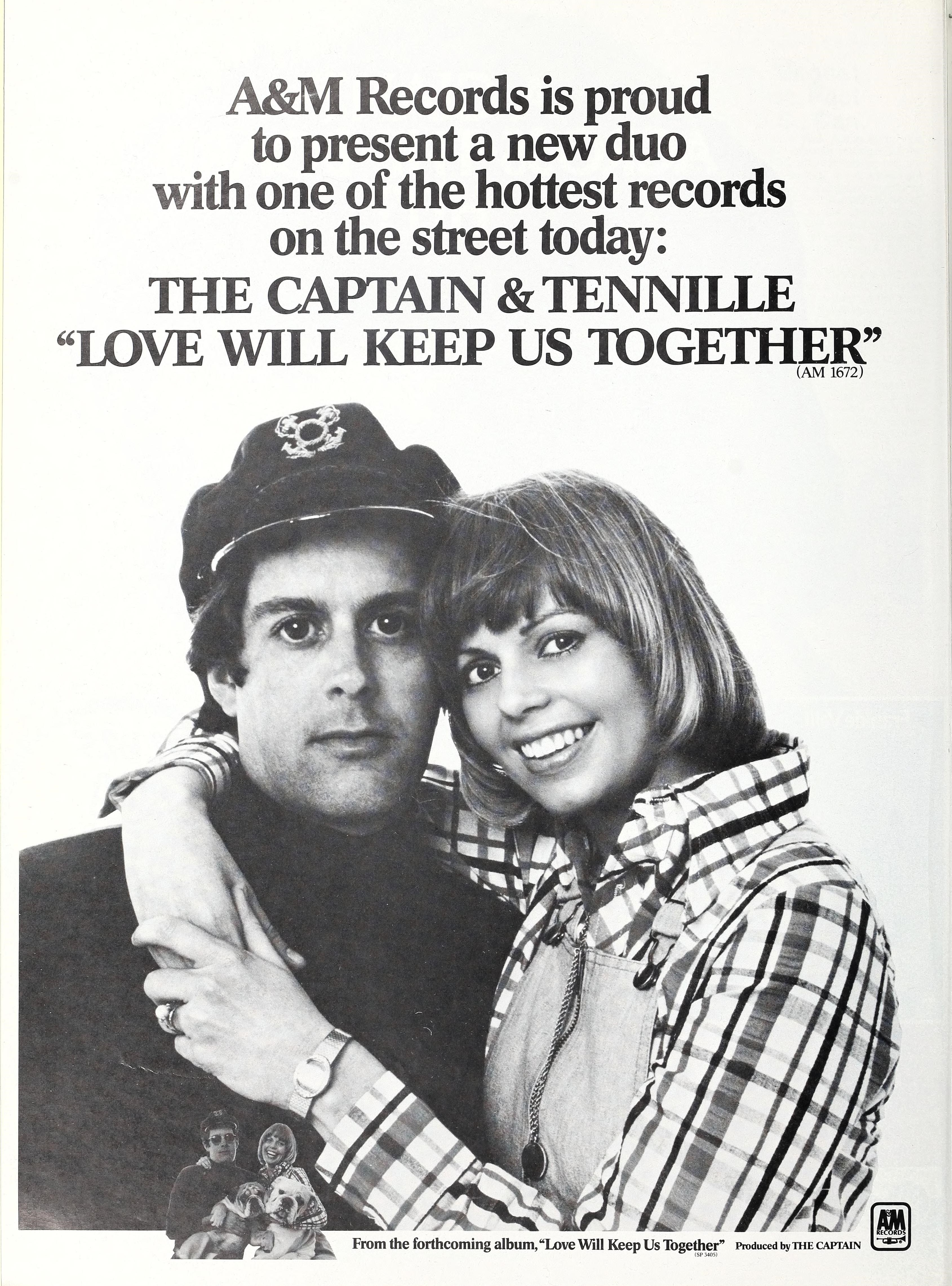
Daryl Dragon (who had megalocornea) with Toni Tenille

Megalocornea (MGCN, MGCN1) is an extremely rare nonprogressive condition in which the cornea has an enlarged diameter, reaching or exceeding 13 mm. It is thought to have two subforms, one with autosomal inheritance and the other X-linked (Xq21.3-q22). The X-linked form is caused by a mutation in a gene CHRDL1 which encodes Chordin-like 1 protein. Men generally constitute 90% of cases.

It may be associated with Alport syndrome, Craniosynostosis, Dwarfism, Down syndrome, Parry–Romberg syndrome, Marfan syndrome, Mucolipidosis, Frank–ter Haar syndrome, Crouzon syndrome, Megalocornea-intellectual disability syndrome, etc.

== Clinical features ==
Eyes presenting megalocornea are usually highly myopic. There may be 'with the rule' astigmatism, and the lens may be luxated due to zonular stretching. In rare cases, megalocornea might be associated with intellectual disabilities.
