= WFS1 =

Protein-coding gene in the species Homo sapiens

Identifiers
- Aliases: WFS1, CTRCT41, WFRS, WFS, WFSL, wolframin ER transmembrane glycoprotein
- External IDs: OMIM: 606201; MGI: 1328355; HomoloGene: 4380; GeneCards: WFS1; OMA:WFS1 - orthologs

Gene location (Human)
Chr.	Chromosome 4 (human)
Band	4p16.1	Start	6,269,849 bp
Band	4p16.1	End	6,303,265 bp

Gene location (Mouse)
Chr.	Chromosome 5 (mouse)
Band	5|5 B3	Start	37,123,448 bp
Band	5|5 B3	End	37,146,549 bp
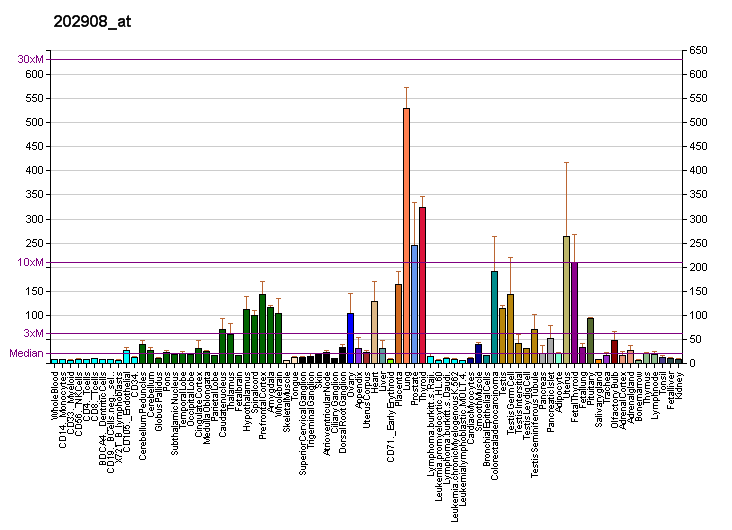
RNA expression pattern
Bgee	Human / Mouse (ortholog); Top expressed in: right ovary; left ovary; body of uterus; nucleus accumbens; stromal cell of endometrium; popliteal artery; tibial arteries; ascending aorta; right lung; gastric mucosa / Top expressed in: olfactory tubercle; nucleus accumbens; Region I of hippocampus proper; extraocular muscle; digastric muscle; thalamic reticular nucleus; plantaris muscle; aortic valve; superior frontal gyrus; sternocleidomastoid muscle; More reference expression data
BioGPS	More reference expression data
Gene ontology
Molecular function	ATPase binding; protein binding; ubiquitin protein ligase binding; calcium-dependent protein binding; calmodulin binding; proteasome binding
Cellular component	integral component of membrane; endoplasmic reticulum membrane; membrane; integral component of endoplasmic reticulum membrane; dendrite; endoplasmic reticulum; proteasome complex; endoplasmic reticulum lumen; integral component of synaptic vesicle membrane
Biological process	negative regulation of neuron apoptotic process; negative regulation of endoplasmic reticulum stress-induced intrinsic apoptotic signaling pathway; calcium ion homeostasis; glucose homeostasis; kidney development; protein stabilization; nervous system process; positive regulation of growth; negative regulation of transcription by RNA polymerase II; hearing; endoplasmic reticulum calcium ion homeostasis; protein maturation by protein folding; negative regulation of ATF6-mediated unfolded protein response; negative regulation of DNA-binding transcription factor activity; response to endoplasmic reticulum stress; ER overload response; IRE1-mediated unfolded protein response; ubiquitin-dependent ERAD pathway; renal water homeostasis; negative regulation of programmed cell death; positive regulation of protein ubiquitination; negative regulation of type B pancreatic cell apoptotic process; visual perception; positive regulation of calcium ion transport; pancreas development; endoplasmic reticulum unfolded protein response; olfactory behavior; post-translational protein modification
Sources:Amigo / QuickGO
Orthologs
Species	Human	Mouse
Entrez	7466	22393
Ensembl	ENSG00000109501	ENSMUSG00000039474
UniProt	O76024	P56695
RefSeq (mRNA)	NM_006005; NM_001145853	NM_011716
RefSeq (protein)	NP_001139325; NP_005996	NP_035846
Location (UCSC)	Chr 4: 6.27 – 6.3 Mb	Chr 5: 37.12 – 37.15 Mb
PubMed search
- Wikidata
View/Edit Human	View/Edit Mouse

Wolframin is a protein that in humans is encoded by the WFS1 gene.

== Function ==
This gene encodes a transmembrane protein, which is located primarily in the endoplasmic reticulum and ubiquitously expressed with highest levels in brain, pancreas, heart, and insulinoma beta-cell lines. Wolframin appears to function as a cation-selective ion channel.

== Clinical significance ==
Mutations in this gene are associated with Wolfram syndrome, also called DIDMOAD (Diabetes Insipidus, Diabetes Mellitus, Optic Atrophy, and Deafness), an autosomal recessive disorder. The disease is characterized by non-immune insulin-dependent diabetes mellitus and bilateral progressive optic atrophy, usually presenting in childhood or early adult life. Diverse neurologic symptoms, including a predisposition to psychiatric illness, may also be associated with this disorder. A large number and variety of mutations in this gene, particularly in exon 8, can be associated with this syndrome. Mutations in this gene can also cause autosomal dominant deafness 6 (DFNA6), also known as DFNA14 or DFNA38.

Mutations in this gene have also been associated with congenital cataracts.
