= Polarity in embryogenesis =

Division of an embryo into two hemispheres (animal and vegetal poles)

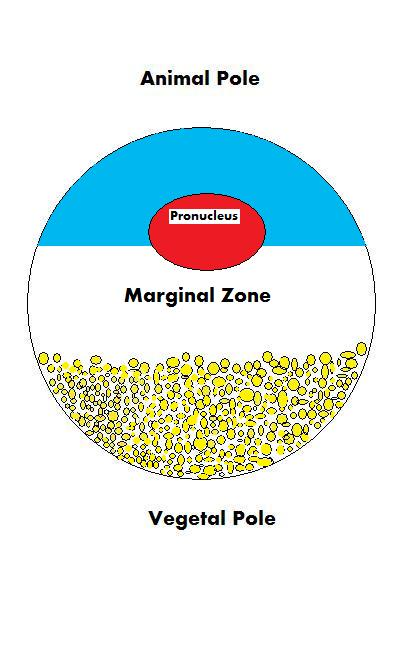
An oocyte with poles depicted

In developmental biology, an embryo is divided into two hemispheres: the animal pole and the vegetal pole within a blastula. The animal pole consists of small cells that divide rapidly, in contrast with the vegetal pole below it. In some cases, the animal pole is thought to differentiate into the later embryo itself, forming the three primary germ layers and participating in gastrulation.

The vegetal pole contains large yolky cells (microlecithal in placental mammals) that divide very slowly, in contrast with the animal pole above it. In some cases, the vegetal pole is thought to differentiate into the extraembryonic membranes that protect and nourish the developing embryo, such as the placenta in mammals and the chorion in birds.

In amphibians, the development of the animal-vegetal axis occurs prior to fertilization. Sperm entry can occur anywhere in the animal hemisphere. The point of sperm entry defines the dorso-ventral axis (or the anteroposterior axis) - cells opposite the region of sperm entry will eventually form the dorsal portion of the body.

In the frog Xenopus laevis, the animal pole is heavily pigmented while the vegetal pole remains unpigmented. A pigment pattern provides the oocyte with features of a radially symmetrical body with a distinct polarity. The animal hemisphere is dark brown, and the vegetal hemisphere is only weakly pigmented. The axis of symmetry passes through on one side the animal pole, and on the other side the vegetal pole. The two hemispheres are separated by an unpigmented equatorial belt. Polarity has a major influence on the emergence of embryonic structures. In fact, the axis polarity serves as one coordinate of the geometrical system in which early embryogenesis is organized.

== Naming ==
The animal pole draws its name from its liveliness relative to the slowly developing vegetal pole. In contrast, the vegetal pole is named for its relative inactivity relative to the animal pole.

== See also ==
- Gastrulation
- Embryogenesis
