= List of intestinal epithelial differentiation genes =

Table of genes implicated in development and differentiation of the intestinal epithelium

The table listed below is a running comprehensive list of all intestinal differential genes that have been reported in the literature. The PMID is the pubmed identification number of the papers that support the summarized information in the table corresponding to each row.

Official	Common	Function/phenotype	PMID
APC		Conditional deletion promotes Paneth cell differentiation at the expense of enterocyte, goblet and enteroendocrine cell differentiation. Negative regulator of beta-catenin	15716339
ATOH1	Math1, HATH1	Commitment to secretory lineage	20691176 17570220 11739954
BLIMP1	PRDM1	Postnatal epithelial maturation; suckling/weaning transition	21878906 21670299
BMPR1A		Involved in terminal differentiation of secretory cells	17678919
CBFA2T2	Mtgr1	Required for maintenance of secretory lineage	16227606
CDH1	E-cadherin	Required for maturation/localization of Paneth and goblet cells	21179475
CDX1	Cdx1	Induced expression promoted enterocyte differentiation in IEC6 cells	19059241 10579974
CDX2	Cdx2	Involves in epithelial cell maturation as well as goblet and Paneth cell differentiation. Required for the small intestinal identity during development. In IEC-6 cells, conditional expression induced enterocyte and goblet like cells	21081128 19386267 8552090
CTNNB1	Catenin, beta	Paneth cell differentiation. Essential for stem cell/crypt maintenance. Villus and crypt morphogenesis with Tcf3 via c-Myc	18948094 17785439 17681174
DLL1		Functions as a cis acting element and required for goblet cell differentiation in the Notch inactive colonic epithelia. Notch ligand in intestine. Required for the maintenance of stem and progenitors	20170633 21238454
DLL4		Notch ligand in intestine. Required for the maintenance of stem and progenitors	21238454
ELF3	ESE-1	Terminal differentiation of absorptive enterocytes	19801644
EPHB3		Localization of Paneth cells to crypt base	12408869
FGF7	KGF	Regulate epithelial growth and promote differentiation	19326389
FGFR3		Paneth cell specification through beta-catenin/Tcf4 dependent and independent pathway. Significant reduction in Paneth cell in knockout mice. Involved in crypt development and stem cell expansion	19407216
FOXA1	HNF3A	Involved in goblet cell differentiation and enteroendocrine differentiation	19737569
FOXA2	HNF3B	Involved in goblet cell differentiation and enteroendocrine differentiation	19737569
FZD5		Required for Paneth cell maturation. Loss of Paneth cell genes after conditional deletion	15778706
GADD45GIP1	Crif1	Essential Elf3 coactivator in differentiation of absorptive enterocytes	19801644
GATA6		Regulates proximal-distal identity in the intestines	21262227
GATA4		Required for proximal intestinal identity	16940177 18812176
GFI1		Required for proper allocation of secretory lineage	16230531
HES1	Hes1	Commitment to absorptive lineage	10615124
HNF1A	HNF1-α	Regulates terminal differentiation of enterocytes and secretory cells potentially by direct regulation of Atoh1	20133952 20388655
HNF1B	HNF1-β	Regulates terminal differentiation of enterocytes and secretory cells potentially by direct regulation of Atoh1	20133952 20388655
IHH		Colonocytes differentiation	14770182
KLF4	GKLF	Promotes goblet cell differentiation in colon	21070761 12015290
LGR4	GPR48	Promotes Paneth cell differentiation and crypt cell proliferation. Along with LGR5, acts as the receptor for R-Spondin, a WNT co-ligand that amplifies WNT signaling	21508962 21909076
LGR5	GPR49	Premature paneth cell differentiation in fetal intestine. Intestinal stem cell marker. Along with LGR4, acts as the receptor for R-Spondin, a WNT co-ligand that amplifies WNT signaling	19394326 21727895
MMP9		Negatively regulates terminal differentiation of goblet cells in colon	17484881
MSI1		Suppress paneth cell differentiation independent of Notch and Wnt signaling pathways	19214660
MYBL2		Regulates commitment of colon stem cells to differentiate	20857481; 20133952
MYC		Crypt loss upon conditional deletion in the adult	16954380
NEUROD1	BETA2	Differentiation of Ngn3 enteroendocrine cells into CCK and secretin cells	18022152; 15044355
NEUROG3	NGN3, ATOH5	Commitment to the enteroendocrine cell lineage	17706959; 12456641
NKX2-2	Nkx2.2	Required for a subset of enteroendocrine cells differentiation	18022152
NOTCH1		Regulates absorptive cells vs secretory cells	15959516; 18274550
NOTCH2		Regulates absorptive cells vs secretory cells	15959516; 18274550
NOX1		Regulate ROS to activate Notch signaling and indirectly promote absorptive cell lineage in the colon	20351171
PAX6		Differentiation of GIP in enteroendocrine lineage	18022152; 10478839
PDX1	IPF1	Overexpression causes differentiation of immature intestinal epithelia to enteroendocrine cells. Conditional deletion alters enterocyte and enteroendocrine gene expression	11408276; 19808654
PPARD	PPAR-δ/β	Involves in Paneth cell maturation by modulating IHH expression	16890607
PTK6	BRK	Promote cell cycle exit in Wnt independent pathway and promote enterocyte differentiation	16782882
RB1	pRB	Required for enterocyte terminal differentiation in small intestine	18981186
RBPJ	CBF1	Conversion of progenitors and differentiated cells into goblet cells by conditional deletion	15959515
REG4		Marker for enteroendocrine cells	26287467
SOX9		Required for paneth cell differentiation	17698607; 17681175
SPDEF	PDEF	Regulates terminal differentiation of goblet cells and Paneth cells	19786015; 19549527
STK11	LKB1	Required for normal differentiation of goblet and Paneth cells	19165340
TGFBR2	Tgf-βRII	The critical downstream target of Elf3 for enterocyte differentiation	17408644
VAV		Required for enterocyte differentiation in mouse cecum and colon	19139088
