= Organoid =

Miniaturized and simplified version of an organ

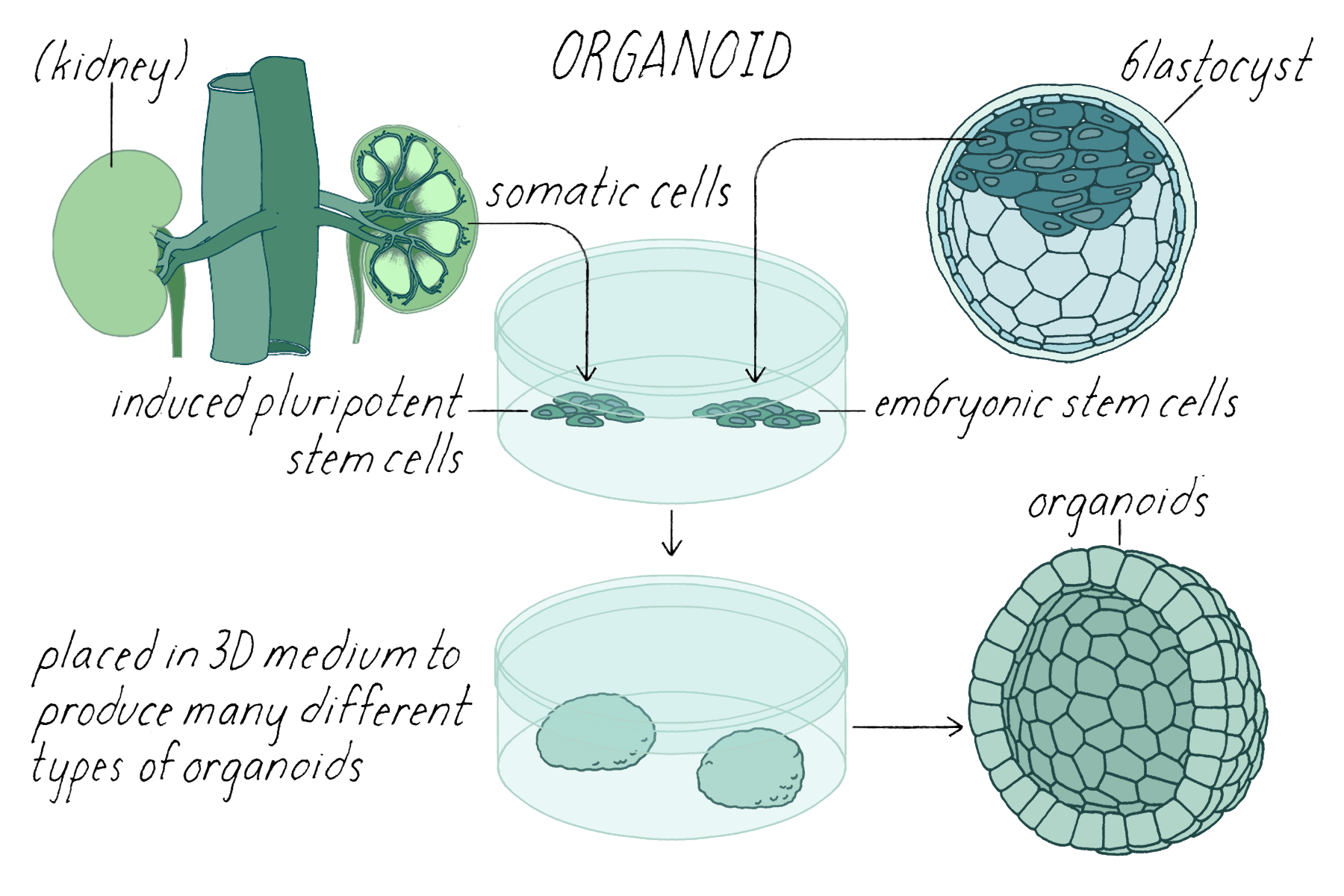
An organoid is a three-dimensional multicellular tissue that is grown from cells in the laboratory and is intended to model the properties and function of an actual organ in the body.

An organoid is a miniaturised and simplified version of an organ produced in vitro in three dimensions that mimics the key functional, structural, and biological complexity of that organ. It is derived from one or a few stem cells from a tissue, embryonic stem cells, or induced pluripotent stem cells, which can self-organize in three-dimensional culture owing to their self-renewal and differentiation capacities. The technique for growing organoids has rapidly improved since the early 2010s, and The Scientist named it one of the biggest scientific advancements of 2013. Scientists and engineers use organoids to study development and disease in the laboratory, for drug discovery and development in industry, personalized diagnostics and medicine, gene and cell therapies, tissue engineering, and regenerative medicine.

== History ==
Attempts to create organs in vitro started in 1907 with one of the first dissociation-reaggregation experiments where Henry Van Peters Wilson demonstrated that mechanically dissociated sponge cells can reaggregate and self-organize to generate a whole organism. In the subsequent decades, multiple labs were able to generate different types of organs in vitro through the dissociation and reaggregation of organ tissues obtained from amphibians and embryonic chicks. The formation of first tissue-like colonies in vitro was observed for the first time by co-culturing keratinocytes and 3T3 fibroblasts. The phenomena of mechanically dissociated cells aggregating and reorganizing to reform the tissue they were obtained from subsequently led to the development of the differential adhesion hypothesis by Malcolm Steinberg in 1964.

With the advent of the field of stem cell biology and the first isolation of pluripotent stem cells from mouse embryos in 1981, the potential of stem cells to form organs in vitro was realized early on with the observation that when stem cells form teratomas or embryoid bodies, the differentiated cells can organize into different structures resembling those found in multiple tissue types. The advent of the field of organoids started with a shift from culturing and differentiating stem cells in two dimensional (2D) media, to three dimensional (3D) media to allow for the development of the complex 3-dimensional structures of organs. Utilization of 3D media culture media methods for the structural organization was made possible with the development of extracellular matrices (ECM). In the late 1980s, Bissell and colleagues showed that a laminin rich gel can be used as a basement membrane for differentiation and morphogenesis in cell cultures of mammary epithelial cells.

Since 1987, researchers have devised different methods for 3D culturing, and were able to utilize different types of stem cells to generate organoids resembling a multitude of organs. In the 1990s, in addition to their role in physical support, the role of ECM components in gene expression by their interaction with integrin-based focal adhesion pathways was reported. In 1998 scientists first isolated stem cells from human blastocysts and cultured them, while the reprogramming of mouse and human fibroblasts to generate Induced pluripotent stem cells (iPSC) was introduced later and greatly enhanced stem cell and organoid research. In 2006, Yaakov Nahmias and David Odde showed the self-assembly of vascular liver-like tissue maintained for over 50 days in vitro. In 2008, Yoshiki Sasai and his team at RIKEN institute demonstrated that stem cells can be coaxed into balls of neural cells that self-organize into distinctive layers.

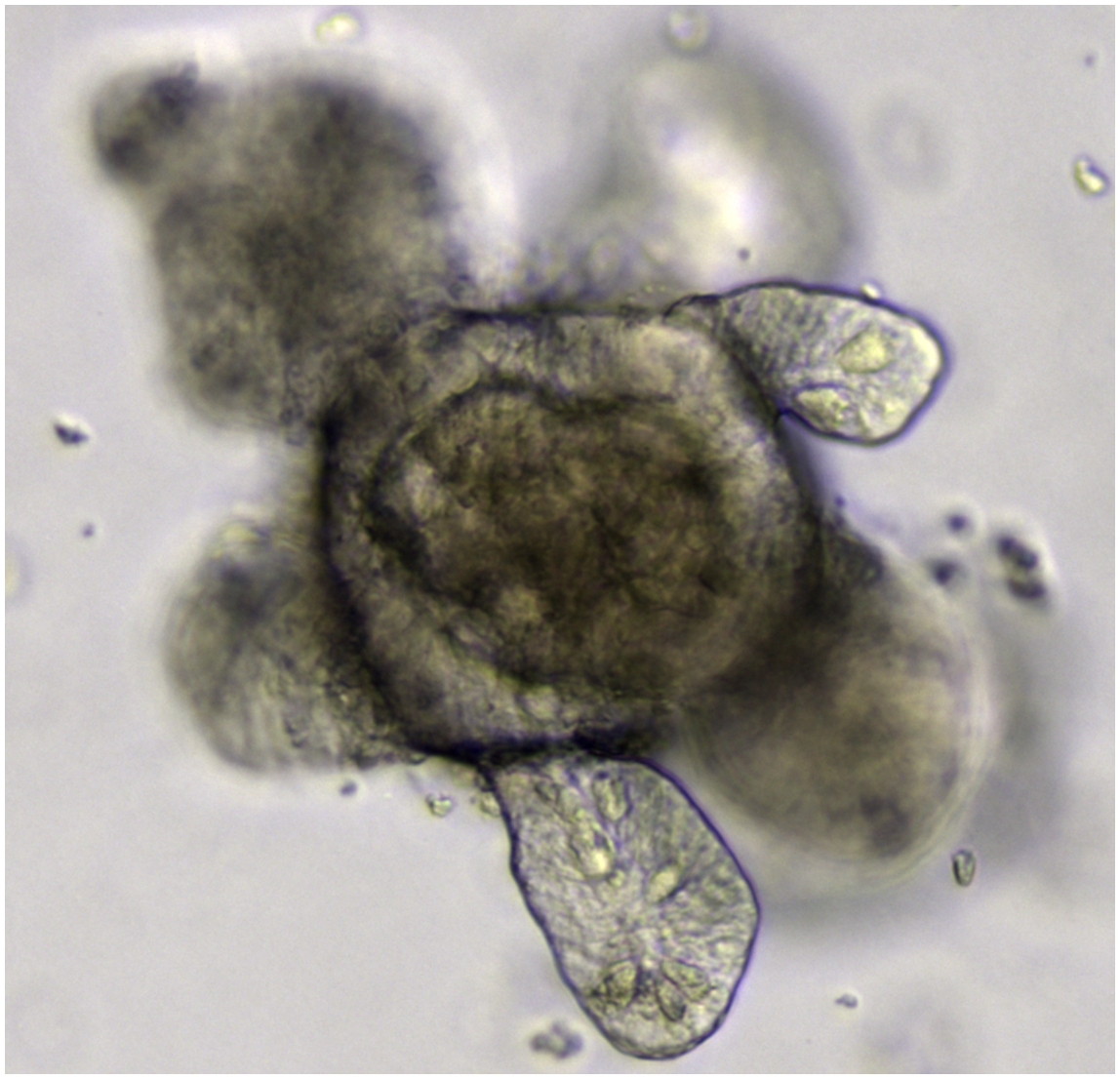
Intestinal organoid grown from Lgr5+ stem cells

In 2009 the Laboratory of Hans Clevers at Hubrecht Institute and University Medical Center Utrecht, Netherlands, showed that single LGR5-expressing intestinal stem cells self-organize to crypt-villus structures in vitro without necessity of a mesenchymal niche, making them the first organoids. In 2010, Mathieu Unbekandt & Jamie A. Davies demonstrated the production of renal organoids from murine fetus-derived renogenic stem cells. In 2014, Qun Wang and co-workers engineered collagen-I and laminin based gels and synthetic foam biomaterials for the culture and delivery of intestinal organoids and encapsulated DNA-functionalized gold nanoparticles into intestinal organoids to form an intestinal Trojan horse for drug delivery and gene therapy. Subsequent reports showed significant physiological function of these organoids in vitro and in vivo.

Other significant early advancements included in 2013, Madeline Lancaster at the Institute of Molecular Biotechnology of the Austrian Academy of Sciences established a protocol starting from pluripotent stem cells to generate cerebral organoids that mimic the developing human brain's cellular organization. Meritxell Huch and Craig Dorrell at Hubrecht Institute and University Medical Center Utrecht demonstrated that single Lgr5+ cells from damaged mouse liver can be clonally expanded as liver organoids in Rspo1-based culture medium over several months. In 2014, Artem Shkumatov et al. at the University of Illinois at Urbana-Champaign demonstrated that cardiovascular organoids can be formed from ES cells through modulation of the substrate stiffness, to which they adhere. Physiological stiffness promoted three-dimensionality of EBs and cardiomyogenic differentiation.

== Properties ==
Lancaster and Knoblich define an organoid as a collection of organ-specific cell types that develops from stem cells or organ progenitors, self-organizes through cell sorting and spatially restricted lineage commitment in a manner similar to in vivo, and exhibits the following properties:

- it has multiple organ-specific cell types;
- it is capable of recapitulating some specific function of the organ (e.g. contraction, neural activity, endocrine secretion, filtration, excretion);
- its cells are grouped together and spatially organized, similar to an organ.

== Process ==
Organoid formation generally requires culturing the stem cells or progenitor cells in a 3D medium. Stem cells have the ability to self-renew and differentiate into various cell subtypes, and they enable understanding the processes of development and disease progression. Therefore organoids derived from stem cells enable studying biology and physiology at the organ level. The 3D medium can be made using an extracellular matrix hydrogel such as Matrigel or Cultrex BME, which is a laminin-rich extracellular matrix that is secreted by the Engelbreth-Holm-Swarm tumor line. Organoid bodies can then be made through embedding stem cells in the 3D medium. When pluripotent stem cells are used for the creation of the organoid, the cells are usually, but not all the time, allowed to form embryoid bodies. Those embryoid bodies are then pharmacologically treated with patterning factors to drive the formation of the desired organoid identity. Organoids have also been created using adult stem cells extracted from the target organ, and cultured in 3D media.

Biochemical cues have been incorporated in 3D organoid cultures and with exposure of morphogenes, morphogen inhibitors, or growth factors, organoid models can be developed using embryonic stem cells (ESCs) or adult stem cells (ASCs). Vascularization techniques can be utilized to embody microenvironments that are close to their counterparts, physiologically. Vasculature systems that can facilitate oxygen or nutrients to the inner mass of organoids can be achieved through microfluidic systems, vascular endothelial growth factor delivery systems, and endothelial cell-coated modules. With patient-derived induced pluripotent stem cells (iPSCs) and CRISPR/Cas-based genome editing technologies, genome-edited or mutated pluripotent stem cells (PSCs) with altered signaling cues can be generated to control intrinsic cues within organoids.

== Types ==
A multitude of organ structures have been recapitulated using organoids. This section aims to outline the state of the field as of now through providing an abridged list of the organoids that have been successfully created, along with a brief outline based on the most recent literature for each organoid, and examples of how it has been utilized in research.

=== Cerebral organoid ===
A cerebral organoid describes artificially grown, in vitro, miniature organs resembling the brain. Cerebral organoids are created by culturing human pluripotent stem cells in a three-dimensional structure using rotational bioreactor and develop over the course of months. The procedure has potential applications in the study of brain development, physiology and function. Cerebral organoids may experience "simple sensations" in response to external stimulation and neuroscientists are among those expressing concern that such organs could develop sentience. They propose that further evolution of the technique needs to be subject to a rigorous oversight procedure. In 2023, researchers have built a hybrid biocomputer that combines laboratory-grown human brain organoids with conventional circuits, and can complete tasks such as voice recognition. Cerebral Organoids are currently being used to research and develop Organoid Intelligence (OI) technologies.

=== Gastrointestinal organoid ===
Gastrointestinal organoids refer to organoids that recapitulate structures of the gastrointestinal tract. The gastrointestinal tract arises from the endoderm, which during development forms a tube that can be divided in three distinct regions, which give rise to, along with other organs, the following sections of the gastrointestinal tract:

1. The foregut gives rise to the oral cavity and the stomach
2. The midgut gives rise to the small intestines and the ascending colon
3. The hindgut gives rise to the rectum and the rest of the colon

Organoids have been created for the following structures of the gastrointestinal tract:

=== Intestinal organoid ===
Intestinal organoids have thus far been among the gut organoids generated directly from intestinal tissues or pluripotent stem cells. One way human pluripotent stem cells can be driven to form intestinal organoids is through first the application of activin A to drive the cells into a mesoendodermal identity, followed by the pharmacological upregulation of Wnt3a and Fgf4 signaling pathways as they have been demonstrated to promote posterior gut fate. Intestinal organoids have also been generated from intestinal stem cells, extracted from adult tissue and cultured in 3D media. These adult stem cell-derived organoids are often referred to as enteroids or colonoids, depending on their segment of origin, and have been established from both the human and murine intestine.

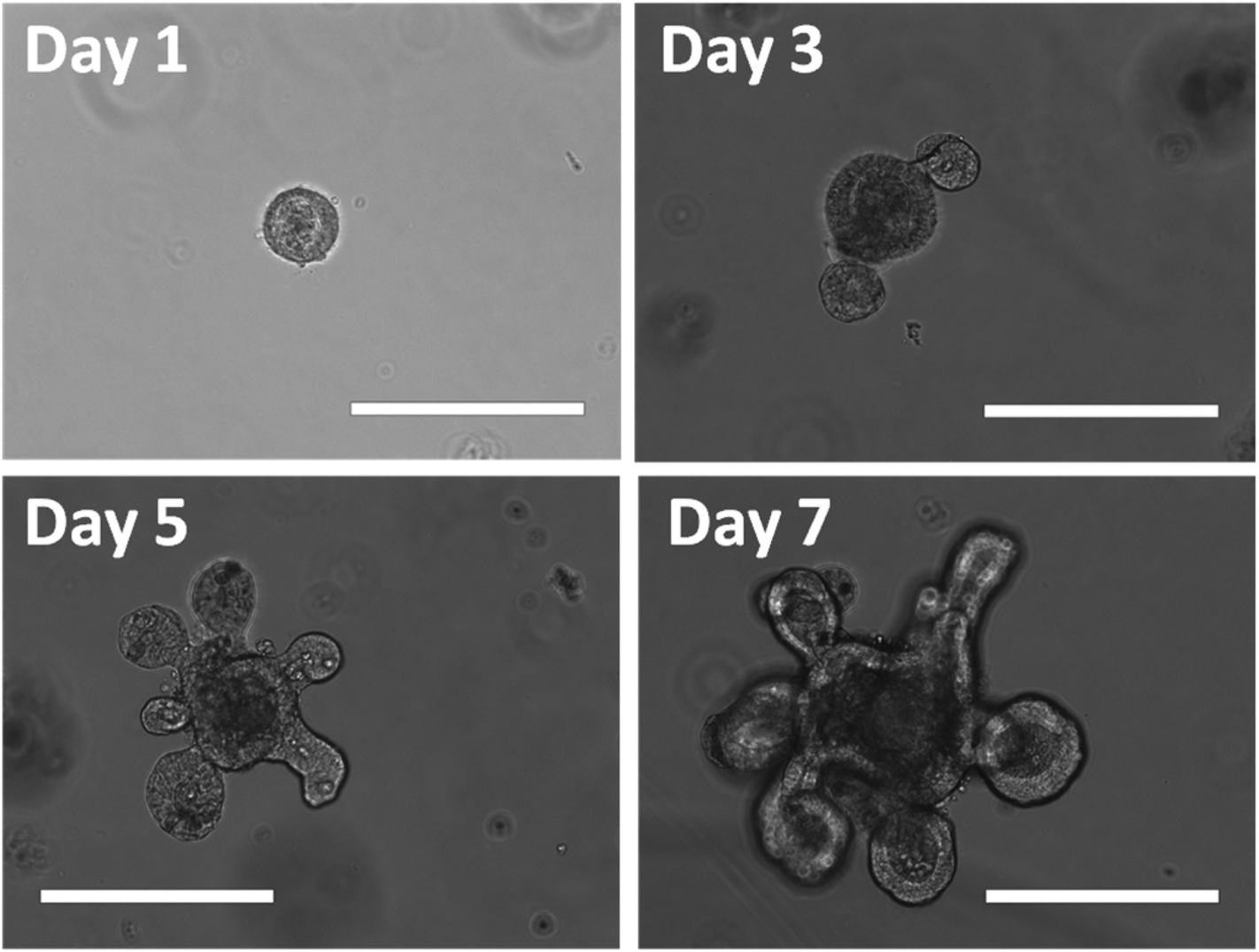
An intestinal organoid (Minigut) grows up in 7 days. The scale bars are 200 μm.

Intestinal organoids consist of a single layer of polarized intestinal epithelial cells surrounding a central lumen. As such, recapitulate the crypt-villus structure of the intestine, by recapitulating its function, physiology and organization, and maintaining all the cell types found normally in the structure including intestinal stem cells. Thus, intestinal organoids are a valuable model to study intestinal nutrient transport, drug absorption and delivery, nanomaterials and nanomedicine, incretin hormone secretion, and infection by various enteropathogens.

For example, Qun Wang's team rationally designed artificial virus nanoparticles as oral drug delivery vehicles (ODDVs) with gut organoid-derived mucosal models and demonstrated a new concept of using newly established colon organoids as tools for high-throughput drug screening, toxicity testing, and oral drug development. Or recently, Sakib, S., and Zou, S. developed graphene oxide nanoparticles for delivering siRNA regulating expression of tumor necrosis factor-α, that aimed to treat intestinal organoids exhibiting an inflammatory phenotype.

Intestinal organoids also recapitulate the crypt-Villus structure to such a high degree of fidelity that they have been successfully transplanted to mouse intestines, and are hence highly regarded as a valuable model for research. One of the fields of research that intestinal organoids have been utilized is that of stem cell niche. Intestinal organoids were used to study the nature of the intestinal stem cell niche, and research done with them demonstrated the positive role IL-22 has in maintaining in intestinal stem cells, along with demonstrating the roles of other cell types like neurons and fibroblasts in maintenance of intestinal stem cells.

In the field of infection biology, different intestinal organoid-based model systems have been explored. On one hand, organoids can be infected in bulk by simply mixing them with the enteropathogen of interest. However, to model infection via a more natural route starting from the intestinal lumen, microinjection of the pathogen is required. In addition, the polarity of intestinal organoids can be inverted, and they can even be dissociated into single cells and cultured as 2D monolayers in order to make both the apical and basolateral sides of the epithelium more easily accessible. Intestinal organoids have also demonstrated therapeutic potential. In order to more accurately recapitulate the intestine in vivo, co-cultures of intestinal organoids and immune cells have been developed. Furthermore, organ-on-a-chip models combine intestinal organoids with other cell types such as endothelial or immune cells as well as peristaltic flow.

=== Gastric organoid ===
Gastric organoids recapitulate at least partly the physiology of the stomach. Gastric organoids have been generated directly from pluripotent stem cells through the temporal manipulation of the FGF, WNT, BMP, retinoic acid and EGF signalling pathways in three-dimensional culture conditions. Gastric organoids have also been generated using LGR5 expressing stomach adult stem cells. Gastric organoids have been used as model for the study of cancer along with human disease and development. For example, one study investigated the underlying genetic alterations behind a patient's metastatic tumor population, and identified that unlike the patient's primary tumor, the metastasis had both alleles of the TGFBR2 gene mutated. To further assess the role of TGFBR2 in the metastasis, the investigators created organoids where TGFBR2 expression is knocked down, through which they were able to demonstrate that reduced TGFBR2 activity leads to invasion and metastasis of cancerous tumors both in vitro and in vivo.

=== Liver and pancreatic organoids ===
Liver progenitor cells, expressing both bile duct and hepatocyte markers, have been known to form organoids in 3D culture conditions with Matrigel and become fully functioning hepatocytes when placed in diseased mouse livers. Later studies demonstrated that similar bipotent progenitor cells derived from adult human bile ducts can be multiplied and maintained long-term in the laboratory; and both human and mouse hepatocytes successfully formed 3D organoid cultures which integrated efficiently into living tissue. Alternatively, it has been shown that if human PSCs are differentiated into hepatic endodermal cells in a 2D culture together with human mesenchymal stem cells and human endothelial cells, when placed in Matrigel they spontaneously form clusters with their own blood vessel networks. When transplanted into in-vivo environments, these clusters can integrate and form functional liver tissue.

Mouse pancreatic organoids form when embryonic pancreatic progenitor cells are plated in Matrigel, and it has been demonstrated that both mouse and human pancreatic organoids generate from adult pancreatic tissue and can differentiate into both duct cells and endocrine cells when transplanted into an organism.

=== Lingual organoid ===
Lingual organoids are organoids that recapitulate, at least partly, aspects of the tongue physiology. Epithelial lingual organoids have been generated using BMI1 expressing epithelial stem cells in three-dimensional culture conditions through the manipulation of EGF, WNT, and TGF-β. This organoid culture, however, lacks taste receptors, as these cells do not arise from Bmi1 expressing epithelial stem cells. Lingual taste bud organoids containing taste cells, however, have been created using the LGR5+ or CD44+ stem/progenitor cells of circumvallate (CV) papilla tissue. These taste bud organoids have been successfully created both directly from isolated Lgr5- or LGR6-expressing taste stem/progenitor cells. and indirectly, through the isolation, digestion, and subsequent culturing of CV tissue containing Lgr5+ or CD44+ stem/progenitor cells.

=== Cerebellar organoid ===
Cerebellar organoid or hind brain organoids tend to recapitulate the cellular diversity of the fetal cerebellum along with some of its distinct cytoarchitectural features. The generation of cerebellar tissue from PSCs requires a secondary induction which leads to the formation of isthmic organizer, which first appears in the cell aggregate in 3D culture. Over the years this area of research has led to cerebellar organoid development which involves the patterning of human pluripotent stem cells resulting in the generation of both cerebellar excitatory and inhibitory progenitor populations. This includes the rhombic lip and the ventricular zone progenitors. Although further research is still ongoing in context of functional and morphological development of Purkinje cells over a longer period of developmental time.

=== Cancer organoids ===
Cancer organoids are three-dimensional in-vitro cell culture systems that are models for studying tumor biology and how different therapeutic react. Derived from stem cells or primary tissue specimens, these structures self-assemble to replicate the architectural and functional characteristics of their tissue of origin. In contrast to traditional two-dimensional monolayer cultures, which inadequately represent the spatial organization and cellular interactions present in tumors, organoids preserve the tumor microenvironment, genomic profiles, and molecular signatures of primary malignancies.

Multiple methodologies exist for generating tumor organoids, ranging from simple techniques utilizing non-adhesive culture surfaces to advanced bioengineering approaches that incorporate microfluidic platforms, synthetic biomaterials, and precisely controlled microenvironmental conditions.

- Retinal organoid
- Breast cancer organoid
- Colorectal cancer organoid
- Glioblastoma organoid

3D organoid models of brain cancer derived from either patient derived explants (PDX) or direct from cancer tissue is now easily achievable and affords high-throughput screening of these tumors against the current panel of approved drugs form around the world.

- Neuroendocrine tumor organoid

=== Other ===
- Tooth organoid (TO) (see also tooth regeneration)
- Thyroid organoid – In recent news, Dr. Sabine Costagliola and fellow authors successfully generated a human thyroid organic from embryonic stem cells by inducing transient over expression of specific transcription factors. Subsequently, they then transplanted these into mice to test their functionality.
- Thymic organoid

Thymic organoids recapitulate at least partly the architecture and stem-cell niche functionality of the thymus, which is a lymphoid organ where T cells mature. Thymic organoids have been generated through the seeding of thymic stromal cells in 3-dimensional culture. Thymic organoids seem to successfully recapitulate the thymus' function, as co-culturing human hematopoietic or bone marrow stem cells with mouse thymic organoids resulted in the production of T-cells.

- Testicular organoid – In March 2026, Wan et al. introduced a culture method to produce testicular organoids from neonatal mouse primary cells. These organoids also supported spermatogenesis and the generation of haploid germ cells for 90 days successfully.
- Prostate organoid
- Hepatic organoid. – A recent study showed the usefulness of the technology for identifying novel medication for the treatment of hepatitis E as it allows to allows to recapitulate the entire viral life cycle.
- Pancreatic organoid

Recent advances in cell repellent microtiter plates has allowed rapid, cost-effective screening of large small molecule drug like libraries against 3D models of pancreas cancer. These models are consistent in phenotype and expression profiles with those found in the lab of Dr. David Tuveson.

- Epithelial organoid – Ye et al. recently introduced the RPMotion system which is a spinning bioreactor that reduces the time and cost of epithelial organoid production. While specifically optimized for 50mL culture suspensions, the system's dynamic environment significantly enhances the organoids growth and proliferation.
- Lung organoid
- Kidney organoid – In 2025, researchers at the Sheba Medical Center and Tel Aviv University announced that they developed human kidney organoids from tissue stem cells that developed without contamination or breakdown for 34 weeks.
- Gastruloid (embryonic organoid) – Generates all embryonic axes and fully implements the collinear Hox gene expression patterns along the anteroposterior axis.
- Blastoid (blastocyst-like organoid)
- Endometrial organoid
- Cardiac organoid – In 2018 hollow cardiac organoids were made to beat, and to respond to stimuli to beat faster or slower.
- Myelinoid (Myelin organoid)
- Blood-brain barrier (BBB) organoid
  Self-assembled cell aggregates consisting of BMECs, astrocytes, and pericytes are emerging as a potential alternative to transwell and microfluidic models for certain applications. These organoids can generate many features of the BBB, such as the expression of tight junctions, molecular transporters, and drug efflux pumps, and can therefore be used to model drug transport across the BBB. Also, they can serve as a model for evaluating the interactions between the BBB and adjacent brain tissue and provide a platform for understanding the combined abilities of a new drug to overcome the BBB and its effect on brain tissue. In addition, such models are highly scalable and easier to manufacture and operate than microfluidic devices. However, they have limited ability to reconstruct the morphology and physiology of the BBB and are unable to simulate physiological flow and shear stress.

== Basic research ==
Organoids enable to study how cells interact together in an organ, their interaction with their environment, how diseases affect them and the effect of drugs. In vitro culture makes this system easy to manipulate and facilitates their monitoring. While organs are difficult to culture because their size limits the penetration of nutrients, the small size of organoids limits this problem. On the other hand, they do not exhibit all organ features and interactions with other organs are not recapitulated in vitro. While research on stem cells and regulation of stemness was the first field of application of intestinal organoids, they are now also used to study e.g. uptake of nutrients, drug transport and secretion of incretin hormones. This is of great relevance in the context of malabsorption diseases as well as metabolic diseases such as obesity, insulin resistance, and diabetes.

== Models of disease ==
Organoids provide an opportunity to create cellular models of human disease, which can be studied in the laboratory to better understand the causes of disease and identify possible treatments. The power of organoids in this regard was first shown for a genetic form of microcephaly, where patient cells were used to make cerebral organoids, which were smaller and showed abnormalities in early generation of neurons. In another example, the genome editing system called CRISPR was applied to human pluripotent stem cells to introduce targeted mutations in genes relevant to two different kidney diseases, polycystic kidney disease and focal segmental glomerulosclerosis. These CRISPR-modified pluripotent stem cells were subsequently grown into human kidney organoids, which exhibited disease-specific phenotypes. Kidney organoids from stem cells with polycystic kidney disease mutations formed large, translucent cyst structures from kidney tubules. When cultured in the absence of adherent cues (in suspension), these cysts reached sizes of 1 cm in diameter over several months. Kidney organoids with mutations in a gene linked to focal segmental glomerulosclerosis developed junctional defects between podocytes, the filtering cells affected in that disease. Importantly, these disease phenotypes were absent in control organoids of identical genetic background, but lacking the CRISPR mutations. Comparison of these organoid phenotypes to diseased tissues from mice and humans suggested similarities to defects in early development.

As first developed by Takahashi and Yamanaka in 2007, induced pluripotent stem cells (iPSC) can also be reprogrammed from patient skin fibroblasts. These stem cells carry the exact genetic background of the patient including any genetic mutations which might contribute to the development of human disease. Differentiation of these cells into kidney organoids has been performed from patients with Lowe Syndrome due to ORCL1 mutations. This report compared kidney organoids differentiated from patient iPSC to unrelated control iPSC and demonstrated an inability of patient kidney cells to mobilise transcription factor SIX2 from the golgi complex. Because SIX2 is a well characterised marker of nephron progenitor cells in the cap mesenchyme, the authors concluded that renal disease frequently seen in Lowe Syndrome (global failure of proximal tubule reabsorption or renal Fanconi syndrome) could be related to alteration in nephron patterning arising from nephron progenitor cells lacking this important SIX2 gene expression. A 2013 study by Vosough et al. reported a scalable stirred-suspension bioreactor method for generating functional hepatocyte-like cells from human pluripotent stem cells. The derived cells exhibited key hepatic functions in vitro and successfully engrafted in mouse models of acute liver injury, improving survival without tumor formation.

Other studies have used CRISPR gene editing to correct the patient's mutation in the patient iPSC cells to create an isogenic control, which can be performed simultaneously with iPSC reprogramming. Comparison of a patient iPSC derived organoid against an isogenic control is the current gold standard in the field as it permits isolation of the mutation of interest as the only variable within the experimental model. In one such report, kidney organoids derived from iPSC of a patient with Mainzer-Saldino Syndrome due to compound heterozygous mutations in IFT140 were compared to an isogenic control organoid in which an IFT140 variant giving rise to a non-viable mRNA transcript was corrected by CRISPR. Patient kidney organoids demonstrated abnormal ciliary morphology consistent with existing animal models which was rescued to wild type morphology in the gene corrected organoids. Comparative transcriptional profiling of epithelial cells purified from patient and control organoids highlighted pathways involved in cell polarity, cell-cell junctions and dynein motor assembly, some of which had been implicated for other genotypes within the phenotypic family of renal ciliopathies. Another report utilising an isogenic control demonstrated abnormal nephrin localisation in the glomeruli of kidney organoids generated from a patient with congenital nephrotic syndrome. Things such as epithelial metabolism can also be modelled.

== Personalized medicine ==
Intestinal organoids grown from rectal biopsies using culture protocols established by the Clevers group have been used to model cystic fibrosis, and led to the first application of organoids for personalised treatment. Cystic fibrosis is an inherited disease that is caused by gene mutations of the cystic fibrosis transmembrane conductance regulator gene that encodes an epithelial ion channel necessary for healthy epithelial surface fluids. Studies by the laboratory of Jeffrey Beekman (Wilhelmina Children's Hospital, University Medical Center Utrecht, The Netherlands) described in 2013 that stimulation of colorectal organoids with cAMP-raising agonists such as forskolin or cholera toxin induced rapid swelling of organoids in a fully CFTR dependent manner. Whereas organoids from non-cystic fibrosis subjects swell in response to forskolin as a consequence of fluid transport into the organoids' lumens, this is severely reduced or absent in organoids derived from people with cystic fibrosis. Swelling could be restored by therapeutics that repair the CFTR protein (CFTR modulators), indicating that individual responses to CFTR modulating therapy could be quantitated in a preclinical laboratory setting. Schwank et al. also demonstrated that the intestinal cystic fibrosis organoid phenotype could be repaired by CRISPR-Cas9 gene editing in 2013.

Follow-up studies by Dekkers et al. in 2016 revealed that quantitative differences in forskolin-induced swelling between intestinal organoids derived from people with cystic fibrosis associate with known diagnostic and prognostic markers such as CFTR gene mutations or in vivo biomarkers of CFTR function. In addition, the authors demonstrated that CFTR modulator responses in intestinal organoids with specific CFTR mutations correlated with published clinical trial data of these treatments. This led to preclinical studies where organoids from patients with extremely rare CFTR mutations for who no treatment was registered were found to respond strongly to a clinically available CFTR modulator. The suggested clinical benefit of treatment for these subjects based on the preclinical organoid test was subsequently confirmed upon clinical introduction of treatment by members of the clinical CF center under supervision of Kors van der Ent (Department of Paediatric Pulmonology, Wilhelmina Children's Hospital, University Medical Center Utrecht, The Netherlands). These studies show for the first time that organoids can be used for the individual tailoring of therapy or personalised medicine.

== Organoid transplants ==
The self-renewal and regenerative properties of intestinal organoids make them promising candidates for transplantation therapies, particularly for disease involving epithelial barrier disruption. Notably, transplantation of organoids into the duodenum of mice has been shown to aid in the recovery of mucosal damages on mice with ischemia-reperfusion injury.

The first successful transplantation of an organoid into a human, a patient with ulcerative colitis whose cells were used for the organoid, was carried out in 2022.

== As a model for developmental biology ==
Organoids offer researchers a model to study developmental biology. Since the identification of pluripotent stem cells, there have been advancements in directing pluripotent stem cells fate in vitro using 2D cultures. These advancements in PSC fate direction, coupled with the advancements in 3D culturing techniques allowed for the creation of organoids that recapitulate the properties of various specific subregions of a multitude of organs. The use of these organoids has thus contributed to expanding our understanding of the processes of organogenesis, and the field of developmental biology. In central nervous system development, for example, organoids have contributed to our understanding of the physical forces that underlie retinal cup formation. More recent work has extended cortical organoid growth periods extensively and at nearly a year under specific differentiation conditions, the organoids persist and have some features of human fetal development stages.

== See also ==
- Artificial organ
- Organ culture
- Regenerative medicine
- Wetware computer
- Assembloid
