= Myelinoid =

Line of stem cells for research

A myelinoid or myelin organoid is a three dimensional in vitro cultured model derived from human pluripotent stem cells (hPSCs) that represents various brain regions, the spinal cord or the peripheral nervous system in early fetal human development. Myelinoids have the capacity to recapitulate aspects of brain developmental processes, microenvironments, cell to cell interaction, structural organization and cellular composition. The differentiating aspect dictating whether an organoid is deemed a cerebral organoid/brain organoid or myelinoid is the presence of myelination and compact myelin formation that is a defining feature of myelinoids. Due to the complex nature of the human brain, there is a need for model systems which can closely mimic complicated biological processes. Myelinoids provide a unique in vitro model through which myelin pathology, neurodegenerative diseases, developmental processes and therapeutic screening can be accomplished.

== History ==
In vitro models have been a critical component of many biological studies. Monolayers, or 2D cultures, have been widely used in the past, however, they are limited by their lack of complexity and fail to recapitulate tissue architecture involved in biological processes occurring in vivo. Model organisms, such as Mus musculus, Caenorhabditis elegans, Drosophila melanogaster, and Saccharomyces cerevisiae, recapitulate biological complexity better than 2D monolayer cultures. However, these model organisms do not perfectly capture human biology. Specifically, there are stark differences in brain development between mice and humans. Major developmental differences include variability in division patterns of neural stem cells and localization and types of glial cells that occur at specific stages in development.

Leveraging pluripotent stem cell technologies, brain organoids and cerebral organoids were developed to fill the gap in model systems to study human specific brain development and pathology in vitro. The first cerebral organoid was established in 2013. Since then, various protocols have emerged for generating organoids for different brain regions such as cerebellar, hippocampal, midbrain, forebrain, and hypothalamic organoids. Cerebral organoids provide a neurological model through which diseases, development and therapeutics can be studied. However, a major constraint of cerebral organoids is that they lack robust myelin formation and are therefore not well suited to studies investigating white matter.

This limitation of cerebral organoids was addressed in 2018 when brain organoids containing a robust population of myelinating oligodendrocytes were generated. The process of generating these myelinated brain organoids lasted 210 days and involved the addition of various growth factors and media at specific time points. Due to the prolonged duration of the 2018 protocol, there were efforts to speed up and streamline the differentiation and generation of these myelinated organoids. A similar protocol which differed slightly in growth factors added and timing of media changes was described in 2019. This protocol was able to generate organoids with compact myelin formation by day 160.

Another protocol developed in 2019 demonstrated that myelinated organoid generation could be accelerated further. Using a novel protocol, myelin basic protein (MBP), a marker for oligodendrocyte differentiation and myelination in the CNS, was detectable as early as day 63 (9 weeks) and myelinated axons were observed by day 105 (15 weeks), effectively halving the duration of the protocol.

A protocol of similar duration was established in 2021, however, the resulting organoids differ slightly in their biological context. This protocol leveraged the fact that spinal cord myelination is observed prior to cortical myelination. This protocol generated organoids with robust myelination with a ventral caudal cell fate. These organoids, although not technically brain organoids, can also be used to study myelin disease pathology, validated in the study through generating organoids recapitulating the disease pathology observed in Nfasc 155-/- patients. In this protocol, they referred to their myelinated organoids as "myelinoids" thus creating the category of organoids referred to as myelinoids.

In 2021, a group of researchers aimed to address the fact that the lengthy differentiation protocols renders myelinoids less practical for high throughput experimentation such as drug screening. To do this, scientists developed a human induced pluripotent stem cell (hiPSC) line that relies on early expression of an oligodendroglial gene which enabled the accelerated generation of myelinated organoids in just 42 days. To date, this is the fastest protocol for generating mature oligodendrocytes in a brain organoid.

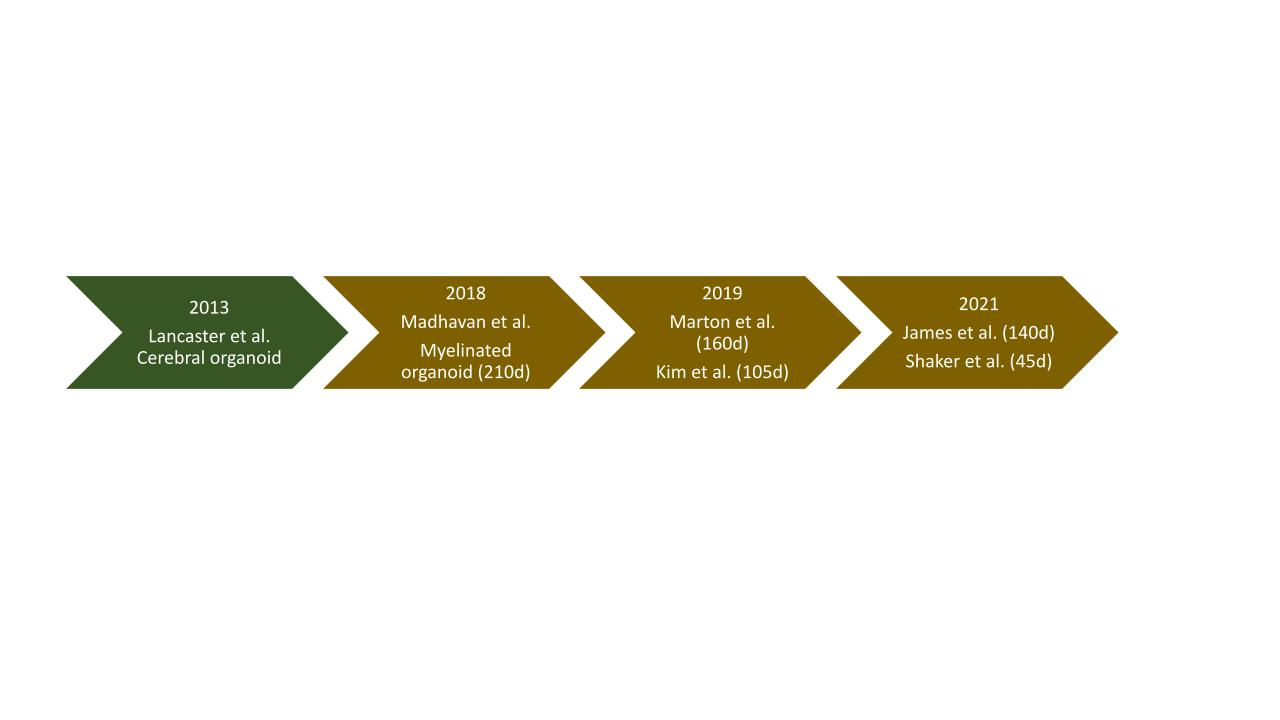
History of cerebral organoid to myelinoid generation protocols

== Culturing methods ==
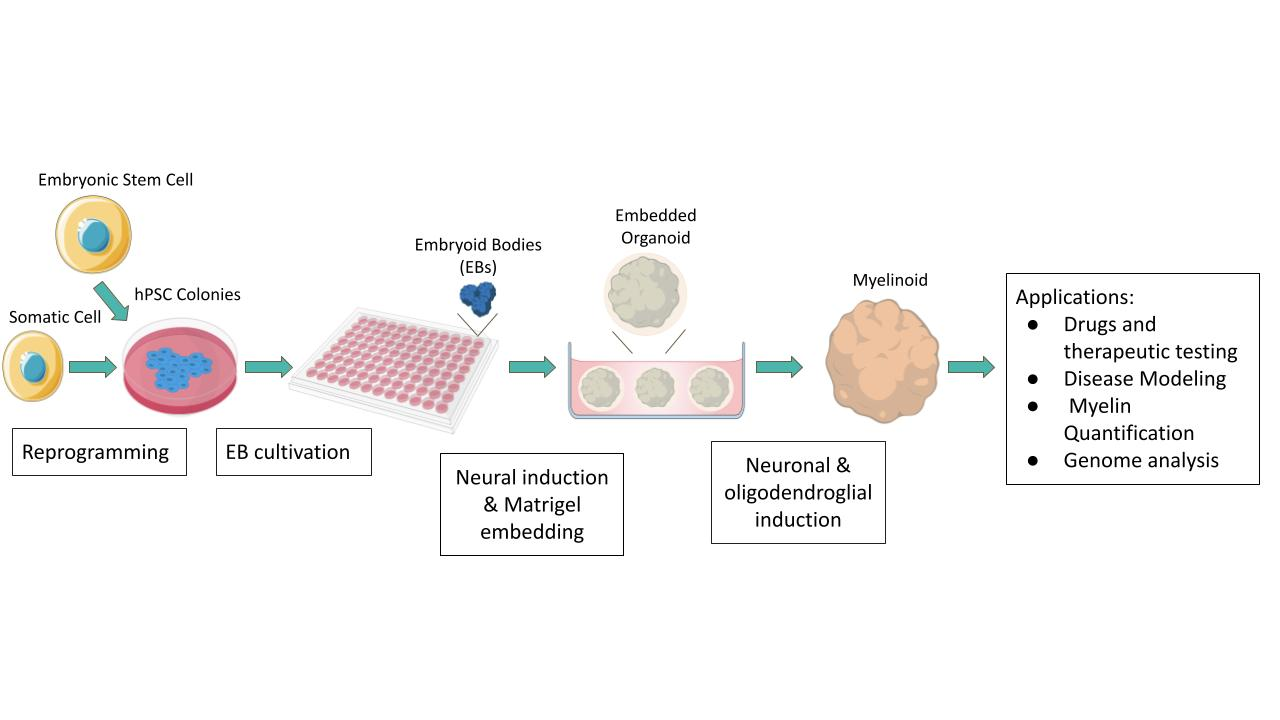
General workflow for generating myelin organoids.

To generate organoids, human pluripotent stem cells (hPSCs) are allowed to aggregate into embryoid bodies (EBs) in low attachment plates (in suspension), which are then cultivated in a rotating bioreactor with lineage specific factors to promote cell amplification, growth and differentiation. EBs have the capacity to differentiate into all embryonic germ layers, mesoderm, endoderm and ectoderm. In vivo, the nervous system, including myelin, is generated from the ectoderm. To recapitulate this in vitro and generate myelin organoids, the EBs are cultured in media with specific growth factors and supplements that lead to ectodermal differentiation specifically, followed by subsequent neural induction. More specifically, neural induction factors are added to induce the formation of neural progenitor cells which give rise to neurons and glial cells, including oligodendrocytes, in vivo.

A well established method used to efficiently differentiate hPSC into neural cells is by dual inhibition of SMAD signaling using dorsomorphin (also known as compound C) and SB431542. To promote further proliferation of neural precursor cells specific growth factors are added to the media such as epidermal growth factor (EGF) and fibroblast growth factor 2 (FGF-2). Before neural and glial induction, the spheroids are generally embedded in an extracellular matrix, such as Matrigel, and transferred to a rotating bioreactor where different small molecules and growth factors are continuously supplemented to promote the differentiation of cells into specific structures and cell types.

In vivo, neuronal induction precedes oligodendrocyte formation. Therefore, in culture, neuronal induction factors are added first to induce neuro-cortical patterning of the spheroids, followed by factors that induce oligodendrocyte precursor cell (OPC) formation and differentiation into oligodendroglia. To promote formation of neurons from neural precursor cells, brain-derived neurotrophic factor (BDNF) and neurotrophic factor 3 (NT3) can be added to the media. Subsequently, factors such as platelet-derived growth factor AA (PDGF-AA) and insulin-like growth factor 1 (IGF-1) are added to the media to result in an expansion of the OPC populations present within the organoid by promoting OPC proliferation and survival.

Finally, factors that induce OPC differentiation into oligodendrocytes, and ultimately myelinating oligodendrocytes, are added. This includes thyroid hormone (T3), which has been shown to induce oligodendrocyte generation from OPCs in vivo. The organoids are maintained in suspension where they grow and mature until required for analysis. The fundamentals of this workflow are generally used to obtain myelin organoids; however, various protocols that rely on it have introduced multiple modifications for different purposes. Madhavan et al. was the first to establish a reproducible protocol that allowed for generating organoids with robust OPC and oligodendrocytes populations, and therefore myelination; they are referred to as myelin organoids, or myelinoids.

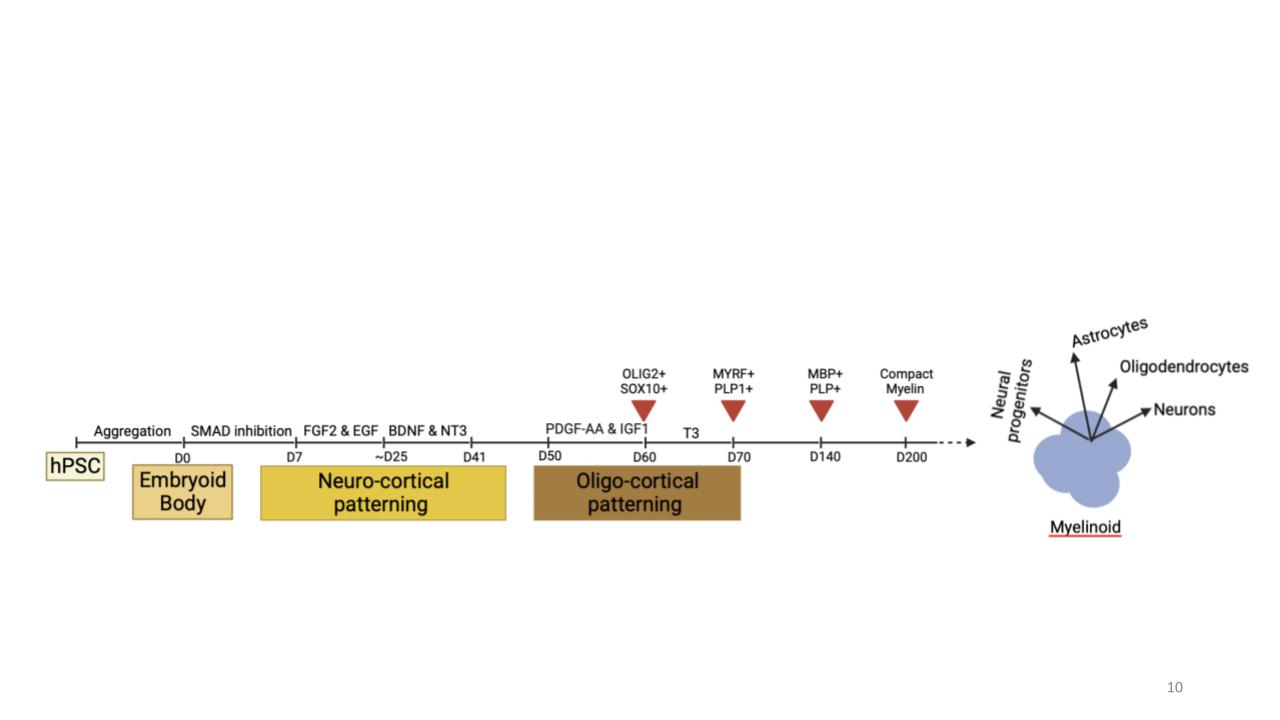
Timeline of small molecules & growth factors for myelinoid differentiation and generation.

== Properties and components ==
The generation of myelin organoids generally relies on neurocortical patterning factors that establish the structural and cellular framework necessary for the induction of oligodendrogenesis later on in the differentiation protocol. Therefore, the properties and components of myelin organoids in the early stages of differentiation are very similar to that observed in cerebral organoids where populations of neural progenitor cells, precursors of neurons and glial cells, start to emerge and self-organize into distinct layers that recapitulate features of the cortex during early embryogenesis.

At such early stages, myelin organoids start to form large continuous neuroepithelial that encompass a fluid filled cavity representative of a brain ventricle. The progenitor cells surrounding the putative ventricle organize into distinct layers defined by specific neural markers that become more defined as the organoid matures. The layers include a ventricular zone surrounding the cavity with cells expressing PAX6, SOX2 and Ki67, followed by the outer subventricular zone and intermediate zone with cells expressing Ki-67 and TBR2, and finally cortical plate layer with cells expressing CTIP2, MAP2 and TBR1.

Following neurocortical patterning, the oligodendrocyte lineage growth factors drive the expansion of native populations of OPCs distributed causing a substantial increase in their numbers which express SOX6, SOX10 and OLIG2, markers of glial induction and OPC specification. As the myelin organoid matures, the OPC cells differentiate into oligodendrocytes that express proteolipid protein 1 (PLP1), the predominant component of myelin, and MYRF25, an oligodendrocyte specific transcription factor. The oligodendrocytes are distributed throughout the neuronal layers, where upon maturation, their processes express MBP and CNP (an early myelination marker), begin extending to wrap and myelinate the axons surrounding them. The myelin undergoes maturation, refinement and compaction eventually leading to the formation of functional neuronal networks with compactly wrapped myelin lamellae. Further myelin maturation leads to distinct axonal subdomains with a paranodal axo-glial junction (PNJ) and node of Ranvier. The observation of paranodal and nodal assembly is protocol dependent, some observe paranodal and nodal assembly, some do not. Overall, the oligodendrocytes in myelin organoids demonstrate the ability to form compact myelin that wraps and organizes around neuronal axons recapitulating the three dimensional architecture of myelinated axonal networks in humans.

== Applications ==
=== Disease modelling ===
Myelinoids recapitulate various fundamental aspects of brain development and myelination, and therefore related disease and pathology. Given that, they can be used to model various diseases and understand disease mechanisms associated with myelin defects including neurodegenerative diseases, CNS injury, PMD, and NFASC.

==== Pelizaeus-Merzbacher disease (PMD) ====
PMD is a rare monogenic disease caused by various mutations of the X-linked proteolipid protein 1 gene (PLP1). PLP1 is a critical protein for myelin formation. PMD is classified as a leukodystrophy, meaning that it is a disease affecting the white matter of the brain. Madhavan et al. tested how well their myelinoid system could recapitulate the established cellular pathology of PMD. Organoids were derived from three patients with varying disease severity where the subject with a deletion, a duplication, and a point mutation had mild, moderate and severe phenotypes respectively. Their results demonstrated that the myelinating oligocortical spheroids generated recapitulated the degrees of cellular pathology associated with the genetic variants, therefore can serve as models for understanding the relationships between PMD genotypes and phenotypes, which have not been fully characterized yet, therefore can serve as models for understanding the relationships between PMD genotypes and phenotypes, which have not been fully characterized yet.

==== Neurofascin (NFASC) nonsense mutation ====
The NFASC gene encodes a cell adhesion molecule that is involved in neurite outgrowth and fasciculation. Additionally, NFASC is involved in the organization of axonal initiation segment and the nodes of Ranvier during development. Patients with nonsense mutations in NFASC have abnormalities in the paranodal axo-glial junction (PNJ). James et al. demonstrated that patient derived myelinoids had widespread formation of myelinoids of both patient and control; however, as expected, the PNJ in patient derived myelinoids had disrupted paranode formation.

=== Myelin structure and integrity analysis ===
Myelin structure and integrity is inherently hard to study in humans at a molecular level. MRI can shed light on myelin abnormalities in a human brain, however, many studies utilize animal models to study myelin related changes in response to genetic variants. Myelinoids provide a 3D human derived system to study myelin structure. Measuring the number and length of myelin sheaths, paranodal/nodal organization and structure, myelin volume and compaction, cellular identity and composition, and cellular organization are all methods for quantifying myelin changes.

=== Testing drugs and therapeutics ===
Studies have shown that in myelinoids, human myelination can be pharmacologically manipulated in a quantifiable manner at both cellular and global levels across the myelinoids. Therefore, myelin organoids can be used as a preclinical model for evaluating myelin associated candidate therapeutics and drugs in a human physiologically relevant context.

==== Promyelinating drugs ====
Myelin organoids can be used to study the therapeutic potential of possible myelination strategies for individuals with diseases associated with demyelination such as leukodystrophies and multiple sclerosis, an auto-immune demyelinating disease affecting the CNS. Clemastine and ketoconazole are promyelinating drugs that function as potent stimulators of oligodendrocyte generation and myelination in rodent models. The previously known effects of both drugs have been recapitulated using myelin organoids as they enhanced and accelerated the extent and rate of oligodendrocyte generation, maturation and myelination in organoids.

==== Er stress pathway small-molecule modulators ====
Certain classes of Pelizaeus-Merzbacher disease (PMD), proteolipid protein 1 (PLP1) show perinuclear retention in oligodendrocytes. Perinuclear retention of misfolded proteins is a hallmark of endoplasmic reticulum (ER) stress, which might be implicated in the pathology observed in PMD. In a myelinoid model of Pelizaeus-Merzbacher disease (PMD) developed in 2018, treatment with a modulator of ER stress pathways called GSK2656157, an inhibitor of protein-kinase-R-like ER kinase, partially rescued PLP1 perinuclear retention mobilizing it away from the ER and into the processes of oligodendrocytes. In addition, treatment resulted in an increase in the number of cells that show MYRF expression, an oligodendrocyte specific transcription factor, which has been observed to be reduced in PMD oligodendrocytes compared to control.

==== Gene-editing: CRISPR ====
In a myelinoid model of PMD caused by point mutations in proteolipid protein 1 (PLP1), a CRISPR correction to the wildtype sequence in the hPSCs used to generate it rescued some aspects of PMD pathology. The treatment restored the perinuclear retention of PLP1 and mobilization into oligodendrocyte processes and increased the amount of oligodendrocytes that express MYRF, an oligodendrocyte specific marker, to levels observed in healthy controls. The myelin organoids derived from hPSC after the CRISPR correction of PLP1 point mutations generated myelin after 20 weeks in culture.

=== Genome analysis ===
'Omics' has a broad application to organoids and since the development of organoid technology, transcriptome, epigenome, proteome, and metabolome analysis have been used. Additionally, targeted gene editing and host-microbiome interactions have been studied using organoids.

==== Single-cell omics ====
It is not possible to study gene expression patterns of the brain in human subjects, so the ability to recapitulate some of the complexity of the human brain in vitro allows for aspects of human development and disease to be investigated. Single-cell omics is a powerful tool that has been used to identify different subpopulations of oligodendrocyte progenitor cells (OPCs) and mature oligodendrocytes in mouse models which were previously undefined. The heterogeneity of oligodendrocytes was previously thought to be functionally homogeneous; however, distinct cell populations can be characterized through specific transcriptional signatures and gene ontology profiles.

Single-cell RNA sequencing (scRNA seq) analysis of myelinoids generated in 2018, confirmed that there were distinct populations of oligodendrocytes throughout multiple stages of development in oligocortical spheroids which closely matched the single-cell transcriptome data obtained from human fetal cortex. Due to their close transcriptomic resemblance to human fetal brain data, the regulatory landscape of cells within cerebral organoids can inform on the underlying regulatory mechanisms governing human brain development.

In 2020, researchers described an approach to obtain meaningful scRNA seq and assay for transposase-accessible chromatin using sequencing (ATAC-seq) data from brain organoids. The protocol can likely translate to myelin organoids due to the similar biology between cerebral organoids and myelinoids.

==== Orgo-seq ====
Orgo-seq is a framework through which bulk RNA (bRNA) and scRNA sequencing data of organoids can be integrated. This platform was developed to address challenges associated with phenotyping organoids and demonstrated its ability to identify critical cell types and cell type specific driver genes involved with neurodevelopmental disorders and disease manifestation.

Using the Orgo-Seq framework, three datasets (bRNA-seq from donor derived organoids, scRNA-seq data from cerebral organoids and fetal brains in precious studies, and bRNA-seq from the BrainSpan Project of human post-mortem brains) were used to study copy number variants in autism spectrum disorder. They leveraged several datasets to identify the types of cells present and cell specific driver genes in patient derived organoids.

Brain organoids serve as a human-derived model through which genetic variation and its impact on cell specific processes and association with neurodevelopmental and neurodegenerative disorders can be studied. Specifically, myelinoids provide a system to study the cell type specific effects in oligodendrocytes that are disrupted by genetic variants. Overall, Orgo-Seq provides a quantitative and validated framework for investigating driver genes and their role in neurological and neurological disorders. In the future, Lim et al., aim to develop a precision medicine framework to identify gene networks and effects of genetic variants in an organoid system, which would include myelinoids, that recapitulates the patient's exact genetic background.

== Advantages ==
- More physiologically relevant to humans compared to animal models
- A more faithful recapitulation of the complexity of human brain than oligodendrocytes monolayers (2D model system)
- Contains much more robust OPC and myelinating oligodendrocyte populations compared to cerebral organoids (compact myelin formation)
- Personalized therapeutics – Myelinoids from patient derived iPSCs

With the absence of human brain tissue, myelinoids offer unprecedented opportunities for studying oligogenesis and myelination. While animal models are valuable for studying human diseases, they do not fully recapitulate human brain development and show many discrepancies affecting their translatability to human physiology. Considering resemblance of myelin organoids to the human brain, they have been proposed as models bridging between animal models and human physiology.

Other hPSC derived oligodendrocytes systems have been established, such as the two dimensional (2D) monolayer oligodendrocytes models. However, when compared to 2D systems, myelin organoids more faithfully recapitulate the structure and functionality of the developing human brain containing a more physiologically relevant microenvironment including their 3D cytoarchitecture, neural circuits, cell interactions and an overall more physiologically relevant microenvironment.

While cerebral organoids form the brain cytoarchitecture and composition, they generally lack oligodendrocytes, the cells responsible for myelination in the central nervous system. The myelinoid protocol pioneered in 2018, and subsequently modified by others, offer a reproducible method for generating organoids with robust OPC and oligodendrocytes populations that track the endogenous neurons forming functional neuronal networks ensheathed with myelin.

Finally, the ability to generate myelinoids from patient derived hPSCs (induced-PSCs) offer major advantages and opportunities to explore patient-specific pathogenesis over the developmental and maturation stages of oligodendrocytes. This allows for the development of personalized therapeutic approaches.

== Limitations ==
- Experimental variability
- Lengthy myelinoid generation protocol
- Fail to capture all cell types and certain phenotypes (i.e. behavioral abnormalities)
- Necrotic canters

As is the case with every model system, myelinoids have their limitations. Due to the methods involved with generating the organoids, there can be a large degree of experimental variability. Additionally, due to the long duration over which myelination occurs, optimizing the dosage of molecules and treatments involved in myelin development can be difficult. The advantage of drug screening in this model comes with its own limitations. It can be difficult to scale myelinoid experiment to an appropriate scale for high throughput screening due to the long duration of protocols and limited efficiency.

Myelinoids capture a large number of cell types found in vivo, however, they fail to capture all cell types. Microglia are absent in some myelinoids as was observed in the 2021 protocol. Myelinoids also do not capture any behavioral abnormalities.

Finally, a challenge with all organoid cultures is that they rely on diffusion for nutrients to reach cells. Therefore, many organoids will develop a necrotic center due to a lack of nutrients making their way to the innermost cells. Recently, developing vascularized organoids has been of interest and may potentially alleviate this issue. However, myelinoids as described in current protocols are not vascularized.
