= Crown Bioscience =

American biotechnology company

- Type: Subsidiary
- Industry: Pharmaceutical industry
- Founded: 2006; 20 years ago
- Headquarters: San Diego, California, United States
- Area served: Worldwide
- Products: Preclinical and translational pharmaceutical, biotechnology, and biopharmaceutical research
- Owner: JSR Corporation
- Website: www.crownbio.com

Crown Bioscience is an American contract research organization (CRO) that provides preclinical and translational research services to accelerate drug discovery and development. Founded in 2006, Crown Bioscience is headquartered in San Diego, California. It also has 9 other sites throughout the United States, Europe, and Asia-Pacific. The company offers platforms and services to advance oncology and immuno-oncology.

The company was acquired by JSR Corporation in January 2018.

Crown Bioscience is known for capabilities in in vivo, in vitro, ex vivo, and in silico preclinical models. It works with companies in the pharmaceutical and biotechnology industries to assess and quantify the efficacy and pharmacological profile of drug candidates before they move into the clinic stage.

== History ==
The company was founded in 2006 in California and a research and development center (R&D) was established in Beijing, China. The following year an oncology platform was established. In 2008, a new R&D center was founded in Taicang, China and in 2009, a R&D site was founded in the United States.

In July 2013, the company acquired PRECOS Limited which was renamed Crown Bioscience UK Ltd. As part of this acquisition a bioluminescence imaging platform was established. In 2014, the company opened Crown Bioscience Taiwan.

In 2015, Crown Bioscience acquired Molecular Response, which was renamed Crown Bioscience San Diego, US, to expand its PDX and tumor biobank models and services portfolio.

In 2016, Crown Bioscience had its initial public offering on the Taiwan Stock Exchange.

In 2017, an inflammation platform was established, and the UK and US oncology facilities were expanded. The following year the bioinformatics facilities were expanded in Suzhou, China.

That same year the company was acquired by JSR Corporation. The acquisition of Crown Bioscience by JSR Corporation in 2018 allowed the company to extend its portfolio to include contract research and development capabilities.

In 2019, the organoid platform was established, and Crown Bioscience entered into a strategic partnership with Hubrecht Organoid Technology (HUB). The following year the Crown Bioscience Netherlands organoid center was founded.

In July 2021, the company announced it would acquire Ocello B.V., located in the Netherlands, to expand its portfolio of in vitro and high-content imaging services.

In March 2023, the business announced it would acquire the IndivuServ business unit of Indivumed GmbH. Based in Hamburg, Germany, a Share Purchase Agreement (SPA) between both parties was executed on December 29, 2022 and the acquisition was completed in April 2023.

In October 2025, Crown Bioscience opened its site in Kannapolis, North Carolina, USA.

== Products and services ==
The company offers a range of preclinical and translational drug research and development platforms and services. These include in vivo, in vitro, ex vivo, in silico, patient derived xenograft (PDX), cell line derived xenograft (CDX), organoids and 3D models, oncology databases, biomarker, bioanalysis and bioinformatics services, as well as a biobank of liquid and human biospecimens.

These models and platforms are intended for contract research in pharmaceutical and biotechnology drug discovery development. Crown Bioscience's integrated solutions provide predictive data on drug efficacy and safety. The PDX and CDX models offered by Crown Bioscience reflect the complexity of human tumors.
