= LGR6 =

Protein-coding gene in humans

Identifiers
- Aliases: LGR6, GPCR, VTS20631, leucine-rich repeat containing G protein-coupled receptor 6, leucine rich repeat containing G protein-coupled receptor 6
- External IDs: OMIM: 606653; MGI: 2441805; GeneCards: LGR6

Gene location (Human)
Chr.	Chromosome 1 (human)
Band	1q32.1	Start	202,193,799 bp
Band	1q32.1	End	202,319,781 bp

Gene location (Mouse)
Chr.	Chromosome 1 (mouse)
Band	1|1 E4	Start	134,911,039 bp
Band	1|1 E4	End	135,033,014 bp
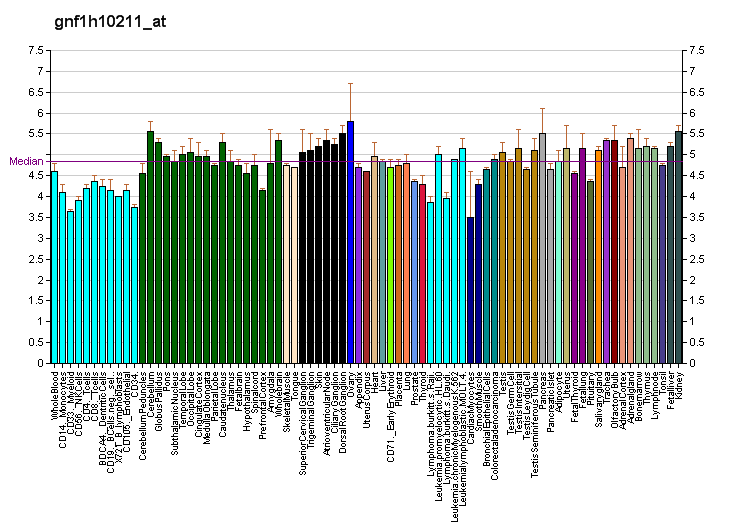
RNA expression pattern
Bgee	Human / Mouse (ortholog); Top expressed in: right coronary artery; Descending thoracic aorta; ascending aorta; left coronary artery; granulocyte; cardiac muscle tissue of right atrium; gastric mucosa; popliteal artery; tibial arteries; anterior pituitary / Top expressed in: ascending aorta; aortic valve; skin of external ear; molar; secondary oocyte; right ventricle; median eminence; primary oocyte; skin of back; epidermis; More reference expression data
BioGPS	More reference expression data
Gene ontology
Molecular function	protein binding; G protein-coupled receptor activity; transmembrane signaling receptor activity; signal transducer activity; protein-hormone receptor activity; heparin binding; Roundabout binding
Cellular component	integral component of membrane; vesicle; plasma membrane; integral component of plasma membrane; trans-Golgi network membrane; membrane; extracellular space
Biological process	positive regulation of canonical Wnt signaling pathway; positive regulation of Wnt signaling pathway; G protein-coupled receptor signaling pathway; Wnt signaling pathway; signal transduction; positive regulation of cell migration; tissue regeneration; bone regeneration; axon guidance; negative chemotaxis
Sources:Amigo / QuickGO
Orthologs
Databases	NCBI: entry; OMA: entry
Species	Human	Mouse
Entrez	59352	329252
Ensembl	ENSG00000133067	ENSMUSG00000042793
UniProt	Q9HBX8	Q3UVD5
RefSeq (mRNA)	NM_001017403; NM_001017404; NM_021636	NM_001033409
RefSeq (protein)	NP_001017403; NP_001017404; NP_067649	NP_001028581
Location (UCSC)	Chr 1: 202.19 – 202.32 Mb	Chr 1: 134.91 – 135.03 Mb
PubMed search
- Wikidata
View/Edit Human	View/Edit Mouse

Leucine-rich repeat-containing G-protein coupled receptor 6 is a protein that in humans is encoded by the LGR6 gene. Along with the other G-protein coupled receptors LGR4 and LGR5, LGR6 is a Wnt signaling pathway mediator. LGR6 also acts as an epithelial stem cell marker in squamous cell carcinoma in mice in vivo.

This gene encodes a member of the leucine-rich repeat-containing subgroup of the G protein-coupled 7-transmembrane protein superfamily. The encoded protein is a glycoprotein hormone receptor with a large N-terminal extracellular domain that contains leucine-rich repeats important for the formation of a horseshoe-shaped interaction motif for ligand binding. Alternative splicing of this gene results in multiple transcript variants.
