= Cerebral organoid =

Artificial miniature brain like organ

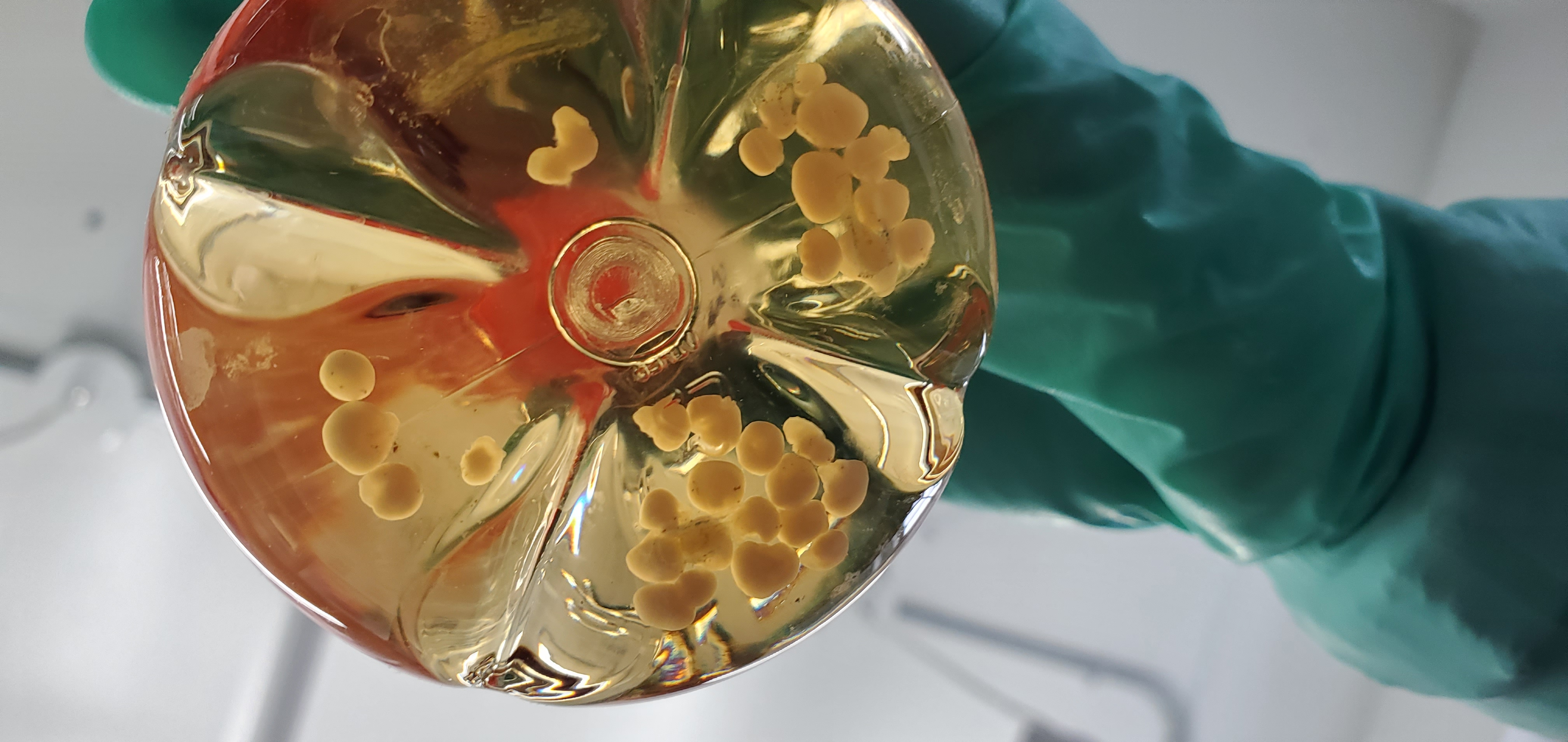
A flask containing human cerebral organoids

A cerebral organoid describes an artificially grown, in vitro, tissue resembling parts of the human brain. Cerebral organoids are created by culturing pluripotent stem cells into a three-dimensional culture that can be maintained for years. The brain is an extremely complex system of heterogeneous tissues and consists of a diverse array of neurons and glial cells. This complexity has made studying the brain and understanding how it works a difficult task in neuroscience, especially when it comes to neurodevelopmental and neurodegenerative diseases. The purpose of creating an in vitro neurological model is to study these diseases in a more defined setting. This 3D model is free of many potential in vivo limitations. The varying physiology between human and other mammalian models limits the scope of animal studies in neurological disorders. Stem cells have the potential to grow into many different types of tissues, and their fate is dependent on many factors. Below is an image showing some of the chemical factors that can lead stem cells to differentiate into various neural tissues; a more in-depth table of generating specific organoid identity has been published. Similar techniques are used on stem cells used to grow cerebral organoids.

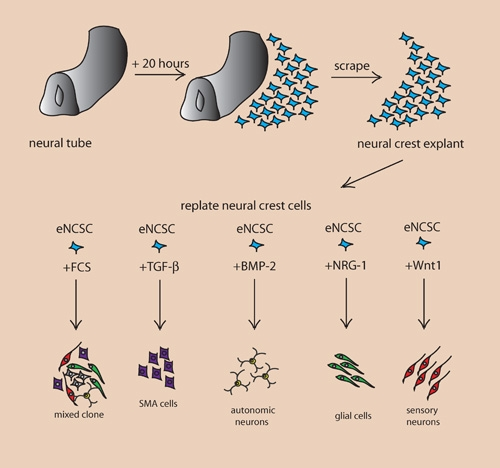
Instructive growth factors regulating fate decisions in embryonic NCSCs

== Model development ==
Using human pluripotent stem cells to create in vitro cerebral organoids allows researchers to analyze current developmental mechanisms for human neural tissue as well as study the roots of human neurological diseases. Cerebral organoids are an investigative tool used to understand how disease pathology works. These organoids can be used in experiments that current in vitro methods are too simplistic for, while also being more applicable to humans than rodent or other mammalian models might be. For example, in vivo rodent models (mice, rats), present ethical concerns for short- and long-term studies, are very expensive and time-consuming, and ultimately misrepresent human physiology (ScienceDirect, 2012). Another in-vitro research model, primary neurons and immortalized cell lines (2D cell culture), have no blood-brain barrier, lack of 3D brain architecture and cell diversity (Spinger Protocols, 2010). Historically, major breakthroughs in how the brain works have resulted from studying injury or disorder in human brain function. An in vitro human brain model permits the next wave in our understanding of the human nervous system.

== Culturing methods ==
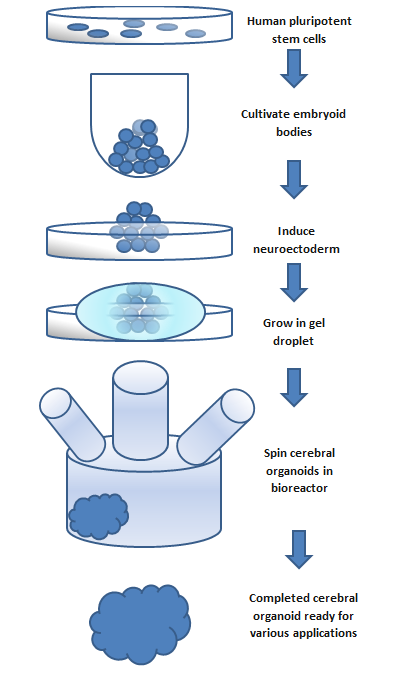
This flow chart outlines the basic steps to create a cerebral organoid. The process takes a span of months and the size of the organoid is limited to the availability of nutrients.

An embryoid body cultivated from pluripotent stem cells is used to make an organoid. Embryoid bodies are composed of three layers: endoderm, mesoderm and ectoderm, which has the potential to be differentiated into different types of tissue.

A cerebral organoid can be formed by inducing ectoderm cells to differentiate into cerebral organoids. The general procedure can be broken down into 5 steps. First human pluripotent stem cells are cultured. They are then cultivated into an embryoid body 55.

Next the cell culture is induced to form a neuroectoderm. The neuroectoderm is then grown in a matrigel droplet. The matrigel provides nutrients and the neuroectoderm starts to proliferate and grow. Replication of specific brain regions in cerebral organoid counterparts is achieved by the addition of extracellular signals to the organoid environment during different stages of development; these signals were found to create change in cell differentiation patterns, thus leading to recapitulation of the desired brain region. SMAD inhibition may be used in usual cerebral organoid culturing processes to generate microglia in cerebral organoids. The lack of vasculature limits the size the organoid can grow. This has been the major limitation in organoid development. The use of a spinning bioreactor may improve the availability of nutrients to cells inside the organoid to improve organoid development. Spinning bioreactors have been used increasingly in cell culture and tissue growth applications. The reactor is able to deliver faster cell doubling times, increased cell expansion and increased extra-cellular matrix components when compared to statically cultured cells.

== Components ==
=== Differentiation ===
It has been shown that cerebral organoids grown using the spinning bioreactor 3D culture method differentiate into various neural tissue types, such as the optic cup, hippocampus, ventral parts of the teleencephelon and dorsal cortex. Furthermore, it was shown that human brain organoids could intrinsically develop integrated light-sensitive optic cups.

The neural stem/progenitor cells are unique because they are able to self-renew and are multipotent. This means they can generate neurons and glial cells which are the two main components of neural systems. The fate of these cells is controlled by several factors that affect the differentiation process. The spatial location and temporal attributes of neural progenitor cells can influence if the cells form neurons or glial cells. Further differentiation is then controlled by extracellular conditions and cell signaling. The exact conditions and stimuli necessary to differentiate neural progenitor cells into specific neural tissues such as hippocampal tissue, optic nerve, cerebral cortex, etc. are unknown. It is believed that cerebral organoids can be used to study the developmental mechanisms of these processes.

=== Gene expression ===
To test if the neural progenitor cells and stem cells are differentiating into specific neural tissues, several gene markers can be tested. Two markers that are present during pluripotent stages are OCT4 and NANOG. These two markers are diminished during the course of development for the organoid. Neural identity markers that note successful neural induction, SOX1 and PAX6, are upregulated during organoid development. These changes in expression support the case for self-guided differentiation of cerebral organoids. Markers for forebrain and hindbrain can also be tested. Forebrain markers FOXG1 and SIX3 are highly expressed throughout organoid development. However, hindbrain markers EGR2 and ISL1 show early presence but a decrease in the later stages. This imbalance towards forebrain development is similar to the developmental expansion of forebrain tissue in human brain development. To test if organoids develop even further into regional specification, gene markers for cerebral cortex and occipital lobe have been tested. Many regions that have forebrain marker FOXG1, labeling them as regions with cerebral cortical morphology, were also positive for marker EMX1 which indicates dorsal cortical identity. These specific regions can be even further specified by markers AUTS2, TSHZ2, and LMO4 with the first representing cerebral cortex and the two after representing the occipital lobe. Genetic markers for the hippocampus, ventral forebrain, and choroid plexus are also present in cerebral organoids, however, the overall structures of these regions have not yet been formed.

=== Organization ===
Cerebral organoids also possess functional cerebral cortical neurons. These neurons must form on the radially organized cortical plate. The marker TBR1 is present in the preplate, the precursor to the cortical plate, and is present, along with MAP2, a neuronal marker, in 30-day-old cerebral organoids. These markers are indicative of a basal neural layer similar to a preplate. These cells are also apically adjacent to a neutral zone and are reelin+ positive, which indicates the presence of Cajal-Retzius cells. The Cajal-Retzius cells are important to the generation of cortical plate architecture. The cortical plate is usually generated inside-out such that later-born neurons migrate to the top superficial layers. This organization is also present in cerebral organoids based on genetic marker testing. Neurons that are early born have marker CTIP2 and are located adjacent to the TBR1 exhibiting preplate cells. Late-born neurons with markers SATB2 and BRN2 are located in a superficial layer, further away from the preplate than the early born neurons suggesting cortical plate layer formation. Additionally, after 75 days of formation, cerebral organoids show a rudimentary marginal zone, a cell-poor region. The formation of layered cortical plate is very basic in cerebral organoids and suggests the organoid lacks the cues and factors to induce formation of layer II-VI organization. The cerebral organoid neurons can, however, form axons as shown by GFP staining. GFP labeled axons have been shown to have complex branching and growth cone formation. Additionally, calcium dye imaging has shown cerebral organoids to have Ca^{2+} oscillations and spontaneous calcium surges in individual cells. The calcium signaling can be enhanced through glutamate and inhibited through tetrodotoxin.

=== Interactions with environment ===
In DishBrain, grown human brain cells were integrated into digital systems to play a simulated Pong via electrophysiological stimulation and recording. The cells "showed significantly improved performance in Pong" when embodied in a virtual game-world. In the 2020s, significant changes in how these electrophysiological systems are made and interact with brain organoids could lead to better stimulation and recording data across the organoind in 3D.

Interactions with surrounding tissues

It is not fully understood how individual localized tissues formed by stem cells are able to coordinate with surrounding tissues to develop into a whole organ. It has been shown however that most tissue differentiation requires interactions with surrounding tissues and depends on diffusible induction factors to either inhibit or encourage various differentiation and physical localization. Cerebral organoid differentiation is somewhat localized. The previously mentioned markers for forebrain and hindbrain are physically localized, appearing in clusters. This suggests that local stimuli are released once one or more cells differentiate into a specific type as opposed to a random pathway throughout the tissue. The markers for subspecification of cortical lobes, prefrontal cortex and occipital lobe, are also physically localized. However, the hippocampus and ventral forebrain cells are not physically localized and are randomly located through the cerebral organoid. Cerebral organoids lack blood vessels and are limited in size by nutrient uptake in the innermost cells. Spinning bioreactors and advanced 3D scaffolding techniques are able to increase organoid size, though the integration of in vitro nutrient delivery systems is likely to spark the next major leap in cerebral organoid development.

== Assays ==
Cerebral organoids have the potential to function as a model with which disease and gene expression might be studied. However, diagnostic tools are needed to evaluate cerebral organoid tissue and create organoids modeling the disease or state of development in question. Transcriptome analysis has been used as an assay to examine the pathology of cerebral organoids derived from individual patients. Additionally, TUNEL assays have been used in studies as an evaluative marker of apoptosis in cerebral organoids. Other assays used to analyze cerebral organoids include the following:

=== Genetic modifications ===
Cerebral organoids can be used to study gene expression via genetic modifications. The degree to which these genetic modifications are present in the entire organoid depends on what stage of development the cerebral organoid is in when these genetic modifications are made; the earlier these modifications are made, such as when the cerebral organoid is in the single cell stage, the more likely these modifications will affect a greater portion of the cells in the cerebral organoid. The degree to which these genetic modifications are present within the cerebral organoid also depends on the process by which these genetic modifications are made. If the genetic information is administered into one cerebral organoid cell's genome via machinery, then the genetic modification will remain present in cells resulting from replication. Crispr/Cas 9 is a method by which this long-lasting genetic modification can be made. A system involving use of transposons has also been suggested as a means to generate long-lasting genetic modifications; however, the extent to which transposons might interact with a cell genome might differs on a cell to cell basis, which would create variable expressivity between cerebral organoid cells. If, however, the genetic modification is made via "genetic cargo" insertion (such as through Adeno-associated virus/ electroporation methods) then it has been found that the genetic modification becomes less present with each round of cell division in cerebral organoids.

=== Computational methods ===
Use of computational methods have been called for as a means to help improve the cerebral organoid cultivation process; development of computational methods has also been called for in order to provide necessary detailed renderings of different components of the cerebral organoid (such as cell connectivity) that current methods are unable to provide. Programming designed to model detailed cerebral organoid morphology does not yet exist.

== Applications ==
There are many potential applications for cerebral organoid use, such as cell fate potential, cell replacement therapy, and cell-type specific genome assays. Cerebral organoids also provide a unique insight into the timing of development of neural tissues and can be used as a tool to study the differences across species. Further potential applications for cerebral organoids include:

=== Tissue morphogenesis ===
Tissue morphogenesis with respect to cerebral organoids covers how neural organs form in vertebrates. Cerebral organoids can serve as in vitro tools to study the formation, modulate it, and further understand the mechanisms controlling it.

=== Migration assays ===
Cerebral organoids can help to study cell migration. Neural glial cells cover a wide variety of neural cells, some of which move around the neurons. The factors that govern their movements, as well as neurons in general, can be studied using cerebral organoids.

=== Clonal lineage tracing ===
Clonal lineage tracing is part of fate mapping, where the lineage of differentiated tissues is traced to the pluripotent progenitors. The local stimuli released and the mechanism of differentiation can be studied using cerebral organoids as a model. Genetic modifications in cerebral organoids could serve as a means to accomplish lineage tracing.

=== Transplantation ===
Cerebral organoids can be used to grow specific brain regions and transplant them into regions of neurodegeneration as a therapeutic treatment. They can fuse with host vasculature and be immunologically silent. In some cases, the genomes of these cerebral organoids would first have to be edited. Recent studies have been able to achieve successful transplantation and integration of cerebral organoids into mouse brains; development of cell differentiation and vascularity was also observed after transplantation. Cerebral organoids might serve as the basis for transplantation and rebuilding in the human brain due to the similarity in structure.

=== Drug testing ===
Cerebral organoids can be used as simple models of complex brain tissues to study the effects of drugs and to screen them for initial safety and efficacy. Testing new drugs for neurological diseases could also result from this method of applying drug high-throughput screening methods to cerebral organoids. After 2015, significant effort has gone into fabricating microscale devices to generate reproducible cerebral organoids at high-throughput.

=== Developmental biology ===
Organoids can be used for the study of brain development, for example identifying and investigating genetic switches that have a significant impact on it. This can be used for the prevention and treatment of specific diseases (see below) but also for other purposes such as insights into the genetic factors of recent brain evolution (or the origin of humans and evolved difference to other apes), human enhancement and improving intelligence, identifying detrimental exposome impacts (and protection thereof), or improving brain health spans.

=== Disease study ===
Organoids can be used to study the crucial early stages of brain development, test drugs and, because they can be made from living cells, study individual patients. Additionally, the development of vascularized cerebral organoids could be used for investigating stroke therapy in the future.

==== Zika virus ====
Zika virus has been shown to have teratogenic effects, causing defects in fetal neurological development. Cerebral organoids have been used in studies in order to understand the process by which Zika virus affects the fetal brain and, in some cases, causes microcephaly. Cerebral organoids infected with the Zika virus have been found to be smaller in size than their uninfected counterparts, which is reflective of fetal microcephaly. Increased apoptosis was also found in cerebral organoids infected with Zika virus. Another study found that neural progenitor cell (NPC) populations were greatly reduced in these samples. The two methods by which NPC populations were reduced were increased cell death and reduced cell proliferation. TLR3 receptor upregulation was identified in these infected organoids. Inhibition of this TLR3 receptor was shown to partially halt some of the Zika induced effects. Additionally, lumen size was found to be increased in organoids infected with Zika virus. The results found from studying cerebral organoids infected with Zika virus at different stages of maturation suggest that early exposure in developing fetuses can cause greater likelihood of Zika virus-associated neurological birth defects.

==== Cocaine ====
Cocaine has also been shown to have teratogenic effects on fetal development. Cerebral organoids have been used to study which enzyme isoforms are necessary for fetal neurological defects caused by cocaine use during pregnancy. One of these enzymes was determined to be cytochrome P450 isoform CYP3A5.

==== Microcephaly ====
In one case, a cerebral organoid grown from a patient with microcephaly demonstrated related symptoms and revealed that apparently, the cause is overly rapid development, followed by slower brain growth. Microencephaly is a developmental condition in which the brain remains undersized, producing an undersized head and debilitation. Microcephaly is not suitable for mouse models, which do not replicate the condition. The primary form of the disease is thought to be caused by a homozygous mutation in the microcephalin gene. The disease is difficult to reproduce in mouse models because mice lack the developmental stages for an enlarged cerebral cortex that humans have. Naturally, a disease which affects this development would be impossible to show in a model which does not have it to begin with. To use cerebral organoids to model a human's microcephaly, one group of researchers has taken patient skin fibroblasts and reprogrammed them using four well known reprogramming factors. These include OCT4, SOX2, MYC and KLF4. The reprogrammed sample was able to be cloned into induced pluripotent stem cells. The cells were cultured into a cerebral organoid following a process described in the cerebral organoid creation section below. The organoid that resulted had decreased numbers of neural progenitor cells and smaller tissues. Additionally, the patient-derived tissues displayed fewer and less frequent neuroepithelial tissues made of progenitors, decreased radial glial stem cells, and increased neurons. These results suggest that the underlying mechanism of microcephaly is caused by cells prematurely differentiating into neurons leaving a deficit of radial glial cells.

==== Alzheimer's disease ====
Alzheimer's disease pathology has also been modeled with cerebral organoids. Affected individual's pluripotent stem cells were used to generate brain organoids and then compared to control models, synthesised from healthy individuals. It was found that in the affected models, structures similar to that of plaques caused by amyloid beta proteins and neurofibrillary tangles, that cause the disease's symptoms were observed. Previous attempts to model this so accurately have been unsuccessful, with drugs being developed on the basis of efficacy in pre-clinical murine models demonstrating no effect in human trials.

==== Autism spectrum disorders ====
Cerebral organoids can also be used to study autism spectrum disorders. In one study, cerebral organoids were cultured from cells derived from macrocephaly ASD patients. These cerebral organoids were found to reflect characteristics typical of the ASD-related macrocephaly phenotype found in the patients. By cultivating cerebral organoids from ASD patients with macrocephaly, connections could be made between certain gene mutations and phenotypic expression. Autism has also been studied through the comparison of healthy versus affected synthesised brain organoids. Observation of the two models showed the overexpression of a transcription factor FOXG1 that produced a larger amount of GABAergic inhibitory neurons in the affected models. The significance of this use of brain organoids is that it has added great support for the excitatory/inhibitory imbalance hypothesis which if proven true could help identify targets for drugs so that the condition could be treated.

The field of epigenetics and how DNA methylation might influence development of ASD has also been of interest in recent years. The traditional method of studying post-mortem neural samples from individuals with ASD poses many challenges, so cerebral organoids have been proposed as an alternate method of studying the potential effect that epigenetic mechanisms may have on the development of autism. This use of the cerebral organoid model to examine ASD and epigenetic patterns might provide insight in regards to epigenetic developmental timelines. However, the conditions in which cerebral organoids are cultured in might affect gene expression, and consequentially affect observations made using this model. Additionally, there is concern over the variability in cerebral organoids cultured from the same sample. Further research into the extent and accuracy by which cerebral organoids recapitulate epigenetic patterns found in primary samples is also needed.

==== Preterm hypoxia/ischemia ====
Preterm hypoxic injury remain difficult to study because of limited availability of human fetal brain tissues and inadequate animal models to study human corticogenesis. Cerebral organoid can be used to model prenatal pathophysiology and to compare the susceptibility of the different neural cell types to hypoxia during corticogenesis. Intermediate progenitors seem to be particularly affected, due to the unfolded protein response pathway. It has also been observed that hypoxia resulted in apoptosis in cerebral organoids, with outer radial glia and neuroblasts/immature neurons being particularly affected.

==== Glioblastomas ====
Traditional means of studying glioblastomas come with limitations. One example of such limitations would be the limited sample availability. Because of these challenges that come with using a more traditional approach, cerebral organoids have been used as an alternative means to model the development of brain cancer. In one study, cerebral organoids were simulated to reflect tumor-like qualities using CRISPR CAS-9. Increased cell division was observed in these genetically altered models. Cerebral organoids were also used in mice models to study tumorigenesis and invasiveness. At the same time, the growth of brain cancers is influenced by environmental factors which are not yet replicable in cerebral organoid models. Cerebral organoids have been shown to provide insight into dysregulation of genes responsible for tumor development.

==== Multiple sclerosis ====
Multiple sclerosis is an auto-immune inflammatory disorder affecting the central nervous system. Environmental and genetic factors contribute to the development of multiple sclerosis, however the etiology of this condition is unknown. Induced pluripotent stem cells from healthy human controls, as well as from patients with multiple sclerosis were grown into cerebral organoids creating an innovative human model of this disease. and showed a reduced oligodendrocyte differentiation, maturation, and myelination capacity as well as an imbalance in astrocyte populations and neuronal population in both cerebral and spinal cord organoids derived from patients with multiple sclerosis

== Limitations ==
Cerebral organoids are preferred over their 3D cell culture counterparts because they can better reflect the structure of the human brain, and because, to a certain extent, they can reflect fetal neocortex development over an extended period of time. While cerebral organoids have a lot of potential, their culturing and development comes with limitations and areas for improvement. For example, it takes several months to create one cerebral organoid, and the methods used to analyze them are also time-consuming. Additionally, cerebral organoids do not have structures typical of a human brain, such as a blood brain barrier. This limits the types of diseases that can be studied. Other limitations include:

=== Necrotic centers ===
Until recently, the central part of organoids have been found to be necrotic due to oxygen as well as nutrients being unable to reach that innermost area. This imposes limitations to cerebral organoids' physiological applicability. Because of this lack of oxygen and nutrients, neural progenitor cells are limited in their growth. However, recent findings suggest that, in the process of culturing a cerebral organoid, a necrotic center could be avoided by using fluidic devices to increase the organoid's exposure to media.

=== Reliability in generation ===
The structure of cerebral organoids across different cultures has been found to be variable; a standardization procedure to ensure uniformity has yet to become common practice. Future steps in revising cerebral organoid production would include creating methods to ensure standardization of cerebral organoid generation. One such step proposed involves regulating the composition and thickness of the gel in which cerebral organoids are cultured in; this might contribute to greater reliability in cerebral organoid production. Additionally, variability in generation of cerebral organoids is introduced due to differences in stem cells used. These differences can arise from different manufacturing methods or host differences. Increased metabolic stress has also been found within organoids. This metabolic stress has been found to restrict organoid specificity. Future steps to streamline organoid culturing include analyzing more than one sample at a time.

=== Maturity ===
At the moment, the development of mature synapses in cerebral organoids is limited because of the media used. Additionally, while some electrophysiological properties have been shown to develop in cerebral organoids, cultivation of separate and distinct organoid regions has been shown to limit the maturation of these electrophysiological properties. Modeling of electrophysiological neurodevelopmental processes typical of development later in the neurodevelopmental timeline, such as synaptogenesis, is not yet suggested in cerebral organoid models. Since cerebral organoids are reflective of what happens during fetal neurodevelopment, there has been concern over how late onset diseases manifest in them. Future improvements include developing a way to recapitulate neurodegenerative diseases in cerebral organoids.

== Ethics ==
=== Sentient organoids ===
Ethical concerns have been raised with using cerebral organoids as a model for disease due to the potential of them experiencing sensations such as pain or having the ability to develop a consciousness. Currently it is unlikely given the simplicity of synthesised models compared to the complexity of a human brain; however, models have been shown to respond to light-based stimulation, so present models do have some scope of responding to some stimuli.

=== Guidelines and legislation ===
Steps are being taken towards resolving the grey area such as a 2018 symposium at Oxford University where experts in the field, philosophers and lawyers met to try to clear up the ethical concerns with the new technology. Similarly, projects such as Brainstorm from Case Western University aim to observe the progress of the field by monitoring labs working with brain organoids to try to begin the 'building of a philosophical framework' that future guidelines and legislation could be built upon.

=== Humanized animals ===
Additionally, the "humanization" of animal models has been raised as a topic of concern in transplantation of human stem cell derived organoids into other animal models. For example, potential future concerns of this type were described when human brain tissue organoids were transplanted into baby rats, appearing to be highly functional, to mature and to integrate with the rat brain. Such models can be used to model human brain development and, as demonstrated, to investigate diseases (and their potential therapies) but could be controversial.

=== Media coverage ===
Studies have examined how brain organoid research is portrayed to the public. An analysis of 93 media articles found increasingly polarized portrayals of brain organoids, particularly regarding chimeras, consciousness, pain, and potential applications. The authors found that media coverage may both inform and misinform public understanding through exaggerated or polarized claims, potentially influencing public attitudes toward brain organoid research. Social media has taken a prominent role in distributing information to the public, prominent science communicators such as scrippsresearch, and Bearbaitofficial have reached potentially millions of viewers, this kind of direct public interaction is of concern to the field. The change to where the public receives information and how accurate that information may be is an ongoing discussion.
