= AUTS2 =

Protein-coding gene in the species Homo sapiens

Identifiers
- Aliases: AUTS2, FBRSL2, MRD26, activator of transcription and developmental regulator, activator of transcription and developmental regulator AUTS2
- External IDs: OMIM: 607270; MGI: 1919847; HomoloGene: 22907; GeneCards: AUTS2; OMA:AUTS2 - orthologs

Gene location (Human)
Chr.	Chromosome 7 (human)
Band	7q11.22	Start	69,598,296 bp
Band	7q11.22	End	70,793,506 bp

Gene location (Mouse)
Chr.	Chromosome 5 (mouse)
Band	5|5 G2	Start	131,466,171 bp
Band	5|5 G2	End	132,572,183 bp
RNA expression pattern
Bgee	Human / Mouse (ortholog); Top expressed in: tibia; ganglionic eminence; bronchial epithelial cell; sural nerve; mucosa of paranasal sinus; parotid gland; lactiferous duct; dorsal motor nucleus of vagus nerve; skin of thigh; external globus pallidus / Top expressed in: lacrimal gland; zygote; fossa; ganglionic eminence; condyle; medial ganglionic eminence; ascending aorta; nucleus accumbens; transitional epithelium of urinary bladder; Amygdala; More reference expression data
BioGPS	n/a
Gene ontology
Molecular function	chromatin binding; protein binding; molecular function
Cellular component	nucleus; growth cone; cytoplasm; cytoskeleton; cell projection; cellular component; actin cytoskeleton
Biological process	positive regulation of histone H3-K4 methylation; positive regulation of transcription by RNA polymerase II; positive regulation of histone H4-K16 acetylation; transcription, DNA-templated; regulation of transcription, DNA-templated; biological process; neuron migration; positive regulation of lamellipodium assembly; actin cytoskeleton reorganization; positive regulation of Rac protein signal transduction; axon extension; dendrite extension; righting reflex; innate vocalization behavior; forebrain neuron development; embryonic viscerocranium morphogenesis; neuron cellular homeostasis
Sources:Amigo / QuickGO
Orthologs
Species	Human	Mouse
Entrez	26053	319974
Ensembl	ENSG00000158321	ENSMUSG00000029673
UniProt	Q8WXX7	A0A087WPF7
RefSeq (mRNA)	NM_001127231; NM_001127232; NM_015570	NM_001363480
RefSeq (protein)	NP_001120703; NP_001120704; NP_056385	NP_001350409
Location (UCSC)	Chr 7: 69.6 – 70.79 Mb	Chr 5: 131.47 – 132.57 Mb
PubMed search
- Wikidata
View/Edit Human	View/Edit Mouse

AUTS2, activator of transcription and developmental regulator is a protein that in humans is encoded by the AUTS2 gene.

== Function ==
This gene has been implicated in neurodevelopment and as a candidate gene for numerous neurological disorders, including autism spectrum disorders, intellectual disability, and developmental delay. Mutations in this gene have also been associated with non-neurological disorders, such as acute lymphoblastic leukemia, aging of the skin, early-onset androgenetic alopecia, and certain cancers.
