= ZNF3 =

Protein-coding gene in the species Homo sapiens

Identifiers
- Aliases: ZNF3, A8-51, HF.12, KOX25, PP838, Zfp113, zinc finger protein 3
- External IDs: OMIM: 194510; MGI: 1929116; GeneCards: ZNF3

Gene location (Human)
Chr.	Chromosome 7 (human)
Band	7q22.1	Start	100,064,033 bp
Band	7q22.1	End	100,082,548 bp

Gene location (Mouse)
Chr.	Chromosome 5 (mouse)
Band	5|5 G2	Start	138,137,964 bp
Band	5|5 G2	End	138,154,006 bp
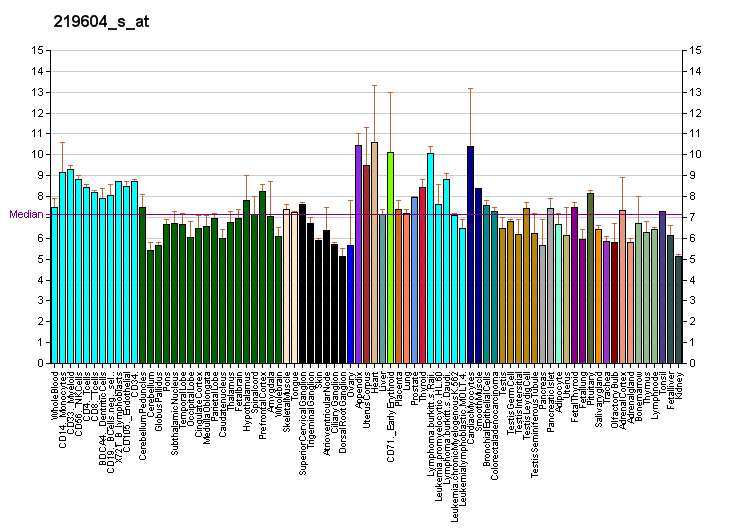

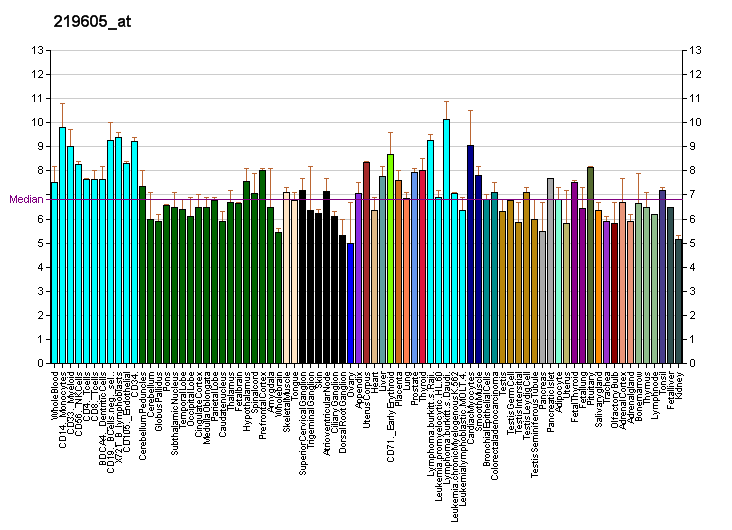

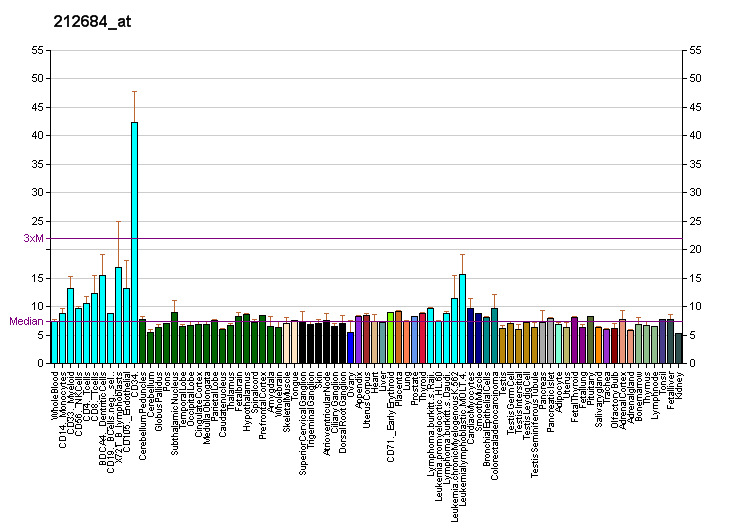
RNA expression pattern
Bgee	Human / Mouse (ortholog); Top expressed in: right uterine tube; ganglionic eminence; secondary oocyte; sural nerve; ventricular zone; rectum; olfactory zone of nasal mucosa; transverse colon; mucosa of transverse colon; left ovary / Top expressed in: tail of embryo; ventricular zone; neural tube; ganglionic eminence; zygote; right kidney; Rostral migratory stream; female urethra; otic vesicle; secondary oocyte; More reference expression data
BioGPS	More reference expression data
Gene ontology
Molecular function	DNA-binding transcription factor activity; DNA binding; zinc ion binding; protein binding; metal ion binding; identical protein binding; nucleic acid binding; DNA-binding transcription factor activity, RNA polymerase II-specific
Cellular component	intracellular anatomical structure; nucleus
Biological process	multicellular organism development; leukocyte activation; cell differentiation; regulation of transcription, DNA-templated; transcription, DNA-templated; regulation of transcription by RNA polymerase II
Sources:Amigo / QuickGO
Orthologs
Databases	NCBI: entry; OMA: entry
Species	Human	Mouse
Entrez	7551	56314
Ensembl	ENSG00000166526	ENSMUSG00000037007
UniProt	P17036; Q86U76	n/a
RefSeq (mRNA)	NM_001278284; NM_001278287; NM_001278290; NM_001278291; NM_001278292 NM_017715; NM_032924; NM_001318135; NM_001318136; NM_001318137	NM_019747
RefSeq (protein)	NP_001265213; NP_001265216; NP_001265219; NP_001265220; NP_001265221 NP_001305064; NP_001305065; NP_001305066; NP_060185; NP_116313; NP_001349704; NP_001349705; NP_001349706; NP_001358139; NP_001358140; NP_001358141; NP_001358142; NP_001358143; NP_001358144; NP_001358145; NP_001358146; NP_001358147; NP_001265220.1; NP_001265221.1	n/a
Location (UCSC)	Chr 7: 100.06 – 100.08 Mb	Chr 5: 138.14 – 138.15 Mb
PubMed search
- Wikidata
View/Edit Human	View/Edit Mouse

Zinc finger protein 3 is a protein that in humans is encoded by the ZNF3 gene.

== See also ==
- Zinc finger
