= LGR5 =

Protein-coding gene in humans

Identifiers
- Aliases: LGR5, FEX, GPR49, GPR67, GRP49, HG38, leucine-rich repeat containing G protein-coupled receptor 5, leucine rich repeat containing G protein-coupled receptor 5
- External IDs: OMIM: 606667; MGI: 1341817; GeneCards: LGR5
Available structures
PDB	Ortholog search: PDBe RCSB
PDB	List of PDB id codes 4BSR, 4BSS, 4BST, 4BSU, 4KNG, 4UFR, 4UFS

Gene location (Human)
Chr.	Chromosome 12 (human)
Band	12q21.1	Start	71,439,798 bp
Band	12q21.1	End	71,586,310 bp

Gene location (Mouse)
Chr.	Chromosome 10 (mouse)
Band	10|10 D2	Start	115,286,216 bp
Band	10|10 D2	End	115,423,685 bp
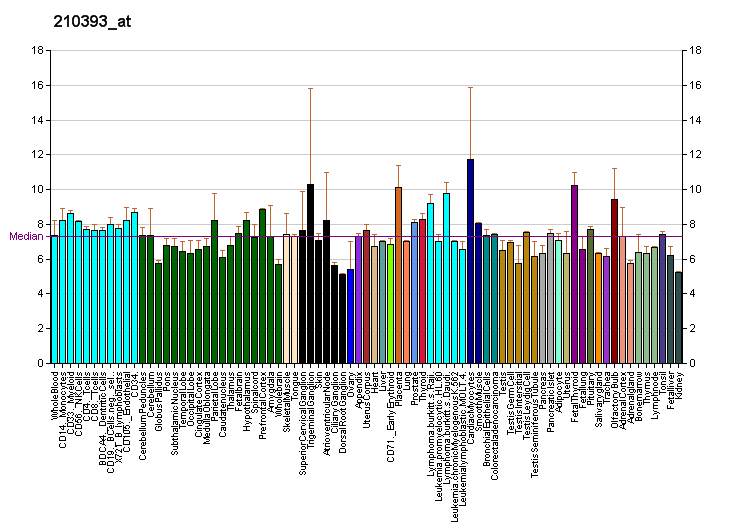

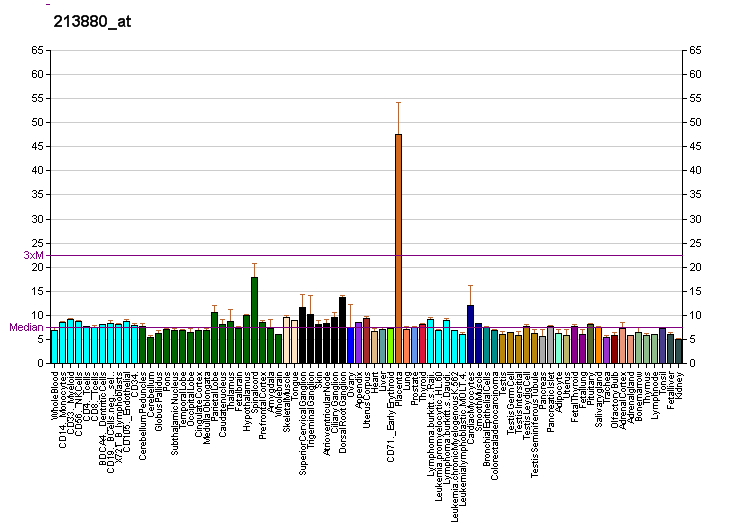
RNA expression pattern
Bgee	Human / Mouse (ortholog); Top expressed in: hair follicle; gastrocnemius muscle; placenta; thoracic diaphragm; skin of hip; spinal ganglia; vastus lateralis muscle; biceps brachii; muscle of thigh; right uterine tube / Top expressed in: crypt of lieberkuhn of small intestine; lip; olfactory bulb; paramesonephric duct; neural layer of retina; lumbar subsegment of spinal cord; calvaria; anterior horn of spinal cord; adrenal gland; Paneth cell; More reference expression data
BioGPS	More reference expression data
Gene ontology
Molecular function	protein binding; G protein-coupled receptor activity; transmembrane signaling receptor activity; signal transducer activity; protein-hormone receptor activity; G protein-coupled peptide receptor activity
Cellular component	integral component of membrane; plasma membrane; Golgi apparatus; integral component of plasma membrane; trans-Golgi network membrane; membrane
Biological process	positive regulation of canonical Wnt signaling pathway; hair follicle development; inner ear development; G protein-coupled receptor signaling pathway; epithelial cell proliferation involved in renal tubule morphogenesis; regulation of cell population proliferation; oocyte differentiation; signal transduction; adenylate cyclase-activating G protein-coupled receptor signaling pathway; activation of adenylate cyclase activity; hormone-mediated signaling pathway
Sources:Amigo / QuickGO
Orthologs
Databases	NCBI: entry; OMA: entry
Species	Human	Mouse
Entrez	8549	14160
Ensembl	ENSG00000139292	ENSMUSG00000020140
UniProt	O75473	Q9Z1P4
RefSeq (mRNA)	NM_001277226; NM_001277227; NM_003667	NM_010195
RefSeq (protein)	NP_001264155; NP_001264156; NP_003658	NP_034325
Location (UCSC)	Chr 12: 71.44 – 71.59 Mb	Chr 10: 115.29 – 115.42 Mb
PubMed search
- Wikidata
View/Edit Human	View/Edit Mouse

Leucine-rich repeat-containing G-protein coupled receptor 5 (LGR5) also known as G-protein coupled receptor 49 (GPR49) or G-protein coupled receptor 67 (GPR67) is a protein that in humans is encoded by the LGR5 gene. It is a member of GPCR class A receptor proteins. R-spondin proteins are the biological ligands of LGR5. LGR5 is expressed across a diverse range of tissue such as in the muscle, placenta, spinal cord and brain and particularly as a biomarker of adult stem cells in certain tissues.

== Gene ==
Prior to its current naming designation, LGR5 was also known as FEX, HG38, GPR49, and GPR67. The Human LGR5 gene is 144,810 bases long and located at chromosome 12 at position 12q22-q23. Both human, rat and mouse homologs contain 907 amino acids and seven transmembrane domains. After translation, the signal peptide (amino acids 1-21) is cleaved off and the mature peptide (amino acids 22-907) inserts its transmembrane domain into the translocon membrane prior to packaging towards the plasma membrane.

== Protein structure ==
LGR5 is highly conserved within the mammalian clade. Sequence analyses showed that the transmembrane regions and cysteine-flanked junction between TM1 and the extracellular domain were highly conserved in sea anemone (Anthopleura elegantissima), fly (Drosophila melanogaster), worm (Caenorhabditis elegans), snail (Lymnaea stagnalis), rat (Rattus rattus) and human (Homo sapiens). Homology amongst the metazoan suggests that it has been conserved across animals and was hypothesised as a chimeric fusion of an ancestral GPCR and a leucine-rich repeat motif.

Sheau Hsu, Shan Liang and Aaron Hsueh first identified LGR5, together with LGR4, in 1998 at the University Medical School Stanford, California using expression sequence tags based on putative glycoprotein hormone receptors in Drosophila.

Experimental evidence show that the mature receptor protein contains up to 17 leucine-rich repeats, each composed of 24 amino acids spanning the extracellular domain flanked by the cysteine-rich N-terminal and C-terminal regions. In contrast, other glycoprotein hormone receptors such as Luteinizing hormone, Follicle-stimulating hormone and Thyroid-stimulating hormone contain only 9 repeats. Sequence alignment showed that the second N-glycosylation site in LGR5 (Asn 208) aligns with that on the sixth repeat of gonadotropin and TSH receptors. The cysteine residues flanking the ectodomain form stabilising disulfide bonds that support the secondary structure of the leucine-rich repeats.

== Function ==
LGR5 is a member of the Wnt signaling pathway. Although its ligand remains elusive, it has been shown that costimulation with R-spondin 1 and Wnt-3a induce increased internalization of LGR5. LGR5 also cointernalizes with LRP6 and FZD5 via a clathrin-dependent pathway to form a ternary complex upon Wnt ligand binding. Moreover, the rapid cointernalization of LRP6 by LGR5 induces faster rates of degradation for the former. It has been shown that the C-terminal region of LGR5 is crucial for both dynamic internalization and degradation to occur, although C-terminal truncation does not inhibit LRP6 interaction and internalization, but rather, heightens receptor activity. Thus, only the initial interaction with its unknown ligand and other membrane bound receptors is crucial in its role in Wnt signalling and not the internalization itself. LGR5 is crucial during embryogenesis as LGR null studies in mice incurred 100% neonatal mortality accompanied by several craniofacial distortions such as ankyloglossia and gastrointestinal dilation.

=== Ligand ===
LGR5 belongs to a class of class A GPCR orphan receptors. Thus its ligands remain elusive. However, it has been shown that Lgr2, the fly orthologue of mammalian LGR5, binds with "high affinity and specificity" with bursicon, an insect heterodimeric, neurohormone that belongs in the same class as FSH, LH and TSH, which in turn are homologous to mammalian bone morphogenetic factors (BMPs) such as gremlin and cerberus. Therefore, LGR5 might be a receptor for a member of the large family of bone morphogenetic protein antagonists. Moreover, R-spondin proteins were shown to interact with the extracellular domain of LRG5. The LGR5 / R-spondin complex acts by binding and subsequently internalizing RNF43 and ZNRF3. RNF43 and ZNRF3 are transmembrane E3 ligases that negatively regulate wnt signaling by ubiquitinating frizzled receptors. Thereby, R-spondin binding to LGR5 potentiates wnt signaling.

== Clinical relevance ==
LGR5 are well-established stem cell markers in certain types of tissue, wholly due to the fact that they are highly enriched in truly, multipotent stem cells compared to their immediate progeny, the transit-amplifying cells.

=== Intestines ===
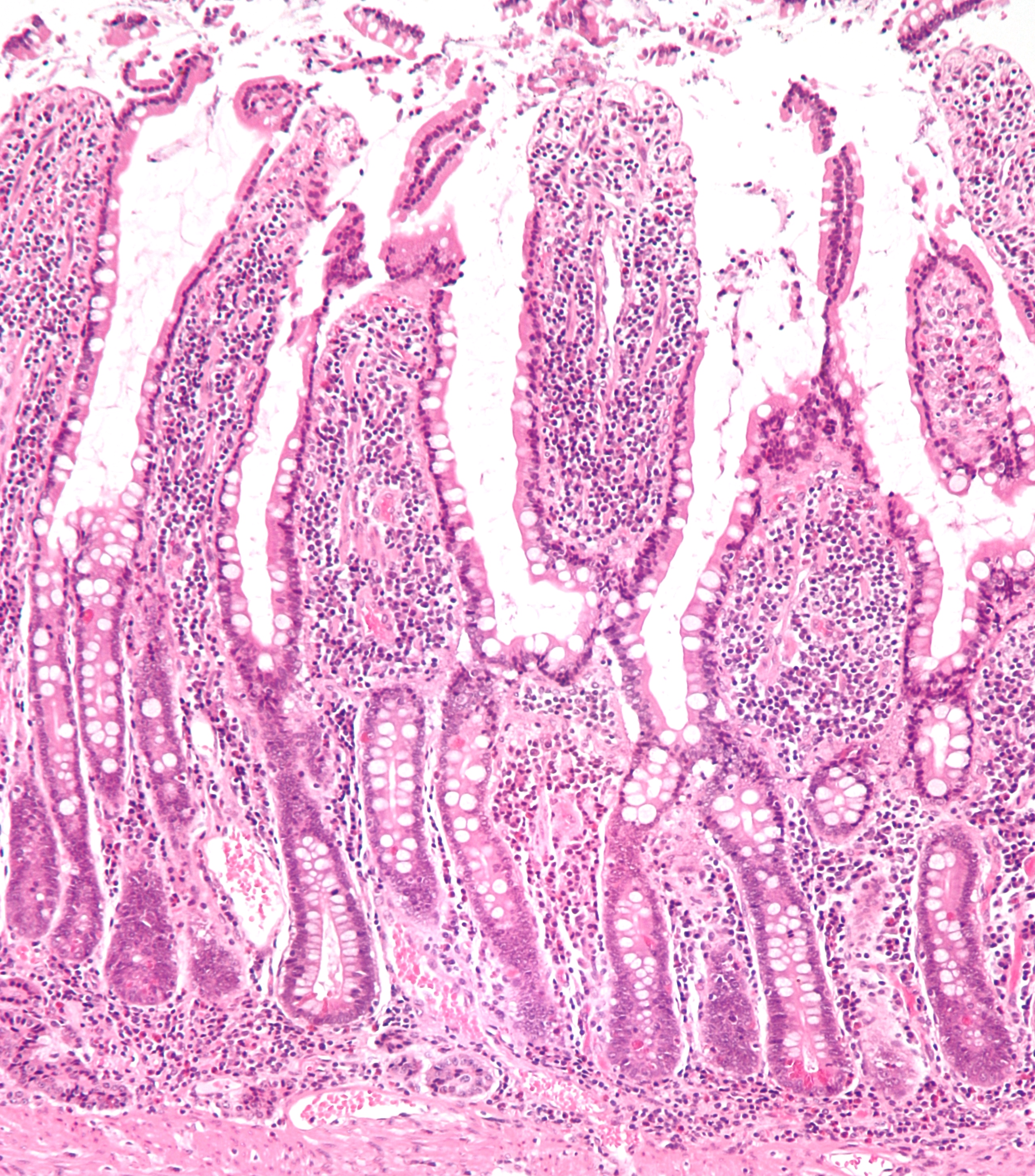
Intestinal crypt structure. LGR5 stem cells are located at the bottom of the crypt

Tracing has revealed that LGR5 is a marker of adult intestinal stem cells. The high turnover rate of the intestinal lining is due to a dedicated population of stem cells found at the base of the intestinal crypt. In the small intestines, these LGR5^{+ve} crypt base columnar cells (CBC cells) have broad basal surfaces and very little cytoplasm and organelles and are located interspersed among the terminally differentiated Paneth cells. These CBC cells generate the plethora of functional cells in the intestinal tissue: Paneth cells, enteroendocrine cells, goblet cells, tuft cells, columnar cells and the M cells over an adult's entire lifetime. Similarly, LGR5 expression in the colon resembles faithfully that of the small intestine.

=== Liver ===
The normal liver has very low expression of LGR5, but when this organ is damaged a LGR5-positive compartment emerges that is instrumental in hepatic regeneration, probably as a consequence of increased Wnt-signaling. The liver cancer process appears dependent on LGR5 expressing cancer stem cells. Human hepatocellular carcinoma and also murine liver cancer is characterised by the presentce of a LGR5-positive compartment not present in healthy liver. These LGR5 expressing are superior in initiating organoids and forming tumors in experimental liver cancer, while LGR5 lineage ablation significantly inhibits organoid initiation and tumor growth.

=== Kidney ===
In vivo lineage tracing showed that LGR5 is expressed in nascent nephron cell cluster within the developing kidney. Specifically, the LGR5^{+ve} stem cells contribute into the formation of the thick ascending limb of Henle's loop and the distal convoluted tubule. However, expression is eventually truncated after postnatal day 7, a stark contrast to the facultative expression of LGR5 in actively renewing tissues such as in the intestines.

=== Stomach ===
The stomach lining also possess populations of LGR5^{+ve} stem cells, although there are two conflicting theories: one is that LGR5^{+ve} stem cells reside in the isthmus, the region between the pit cells and gland cells, where most cellular proliferation takes place. However, lineage tracing had revealed LGR5^{+ve} stem cells at the bottom of the gland, architecture reminiscent to that of the intestinal arrangement. This suggests that LGR5 stem cells give rise to transit-amplifying cells, which migrate towards the isthmus where they proliferate and maintain the stomach epithelium.

=== Ear ===
LGR5^{+ve} stem cells were pinpointed as the precursor for sensory hair cells that line the cochlea.

=== Hair follicle ===
Hair follicle structure where LGR5 stem cells are found in the bulge region

Hair follicle renewal is governed by Wnt signalling that act upon hair follicle stem cells located in the follicle bulge. Although these cells are well characterised by CD34 and cytokeratin markers, there is a growing body of agreement that LGR5 is a putative hair follicle stem cell marker. LGR5 in conjunction with LRG6, is expressed in a remarkable fashion: LRG6^{+ve} stem cells maintain the upper sebaceous gland whilst LRG5^{+ve} stem cells fuel the actual hair follicle shaft upon migration of transit-amplifying cells into the dermal papilla. In between these two distinct populations of stem cells are the multipotent LRG5/6^{+ve} stem cells that ultimately maintain the epidermal hair follicle in adults.

== Cancer ==
The cancer stem cell hypothesis states that a dedicated small population of cancerous stem cells that manages to evade anti-cancer therapy maintains benign and malignant tumours. This explains recurring malignancies even after surgical removal of the tumours. LGR5^{+ve} stem cells were identified to fuel stem cell activity in murine intestinal adenomas via erroneous activation of the pro-cell cycle Wnt signalling pathway as a result of successive mutations, such as formation of adenoma via Adenomatous polyposis coli (APC) mutation. Studies on LGR5 in colorectal cancer revealed a rather perplexing mechanism: loss of LGR5 actually increased tumourigenicity and invasion whereas overexpression results a reduction in tumourigenicity and clonogenicity. This implies that LGR5 is not an oncogene but a tumor suppressor gene, and that its main role is delimiting stem cell expansion in their respective niches. Varying expression profile of LGR5 was also observed in different stages of gastrointestinal cancers, which suggests that the histoanatomical distribution of LGR5^{+ve} stem cells determine how the cancer advances. Densitometry results of LGR5 expression by western blotting in the different cell lines showed that high LGR5 expression levels were apparent in BHK, AGS, VERO and NIH3T3 cell lines compared with the other cell lines.
