= Frizzled-5 =

Protein found in humans

FZD5

Identifiers
- Aliases: FZD5, C2orf31, HFZ5, frizzled class receptor 5
- External IDs: OMIM: 601723; MGI: 108571; GeneCards: FZD5

Gene location (Human)
Chr.	Chromosome 2 (human)
Band	2q33.3	Start	207,762,598 bp
Band	2q33.3	End	207,769,906 bp

Gene location (Mouse)
Chr.	Chromosome 1 (mouse)
Band	1 C2|1 32.74 cM	Start	64,769,717 bp
Band	1 C2|1 32.74 cM	End	64,776,910 bp
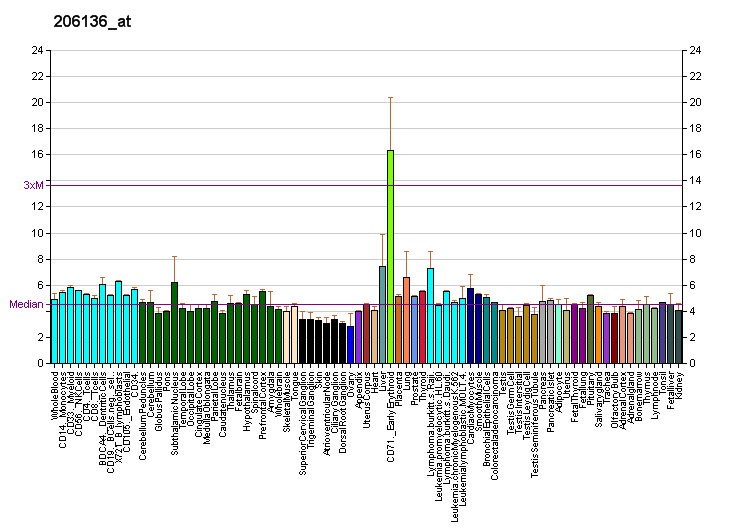
RNA expression pattern
Bgee	Human / Mouse (ortholog); Top expressed in: jejunal mucosa; mucosa of sigmoid colon; lower lobe of lung; mucosa of ileum; duodenum; mucosa of transverse colon; palpebral conjunctiva; kidney tubule; visceral pleura; tibia / Top expressed in: median eminence; hair follicle; epithelium of small intestine; epithelium of stomach; ciliary body; left colon; arcuate nucleus; Paneth cell; calvaria; ileum; More reference expression data
BioGPS	More reference expression data
Gene ontology
Molecular function	amyloid-beta binding; signal transducer activity; Wnt-protein binding; protein binding; protein kinase binding; ubiquitin protein ligase binding; transmembrane signaling receptor activity; Wnt-activated receptor activity; G protein-coupled receptor activity
Cellular component	clathrin-coated endocytic vesicle membrane; Golgi apparatus; early endosome membrane; membrane; bicellular tight junction; Golgi membrane; plasma membrane; cell surface; early endosome; perinuclear region of cytoplasm; integral component of membrane
Biological process	G protein-coupled receptor signaling pathway; T cell differentiation in thymus; chorionic trophoblast cell differentiation; positive regulation of protein targeting to mitochondrion; positive regulation of JUN kinase activity; apoptotic process involved in morphogenesis; regulation of chorionic trophoblast cell proliferation; regulation of bicellular tight junction assembly; regulation of canonical Wnt signaling pathway; cellular response to molecule of bacterial origin; positive regulation of interferon-gamma production; embryonic axis specification; labyrinthine layer blood vessel development; cell maturation; Wnt signaling pathway; embryonic camera-type eye development; multicellular organism development; cell surface receptor signaling pathway; vasculature development; regulation of autophagy of mitochondrion; branching involved in labyrinthine layer morphogenesis; embryonic camera-type eye morphogenesis; post-embryonic camera-type eye development; positive regulation of T cell cytokine production; angiogenesis; neuron differentiation; Wnt signaling pathway involved in dorsal/ventral axis specification; canonical Wnt signaling pathway; synapse assembly; syncytiotrophoblast cell differentiation involved in labyrinthine layer development; anterior/posterior axis specification, embryo; Spemann organizer formation; positive regulation of transcription by RNA polymerase II; negative regulation of cell population proliferation; signal transduction; Wnt signaling pathway, calcium modulating pathway; Wnt signaling pathway, planar cell polarity pathway; beta-catenin destruction complex disassembly
Sources:Amigo / QuickGO
Orthologs
Databases	NCBI: entry; OMA: entry
Species	Human	Mouse
Entrez	7855	14367
Ensembl	ENSG00000163251	ENSMUSG00000045005
UniProt	Q13467	Q9EQD0
RefSeq (mRNA)	NM_030804; NM_003468	NM_001033193; NM_001042659; NM_022721
RefSeq (protein)	NP_003459	NP_001036124; NP_073558
Location (UCSC)	Chr 2: 207.76 – 207.77 Mb	Chr 1: 64.77 – 64.78 Mb
PubMed search
- Wikidata
View/Edit Human	View/Edit Mouse

Frizzled-5 (Fz-5) is a protein that in humans is encoded by the FZD5 gene.

Members of the 'frizzled' gene family encode 7-transmembrane domain proteins that are receptors for Wnt signaling proteins. Fz-5 is believed to be the receptor for the Wnt5A ligand.
