= Embryoid body =

Three-dimensional aggregate of pluripotent stem cells

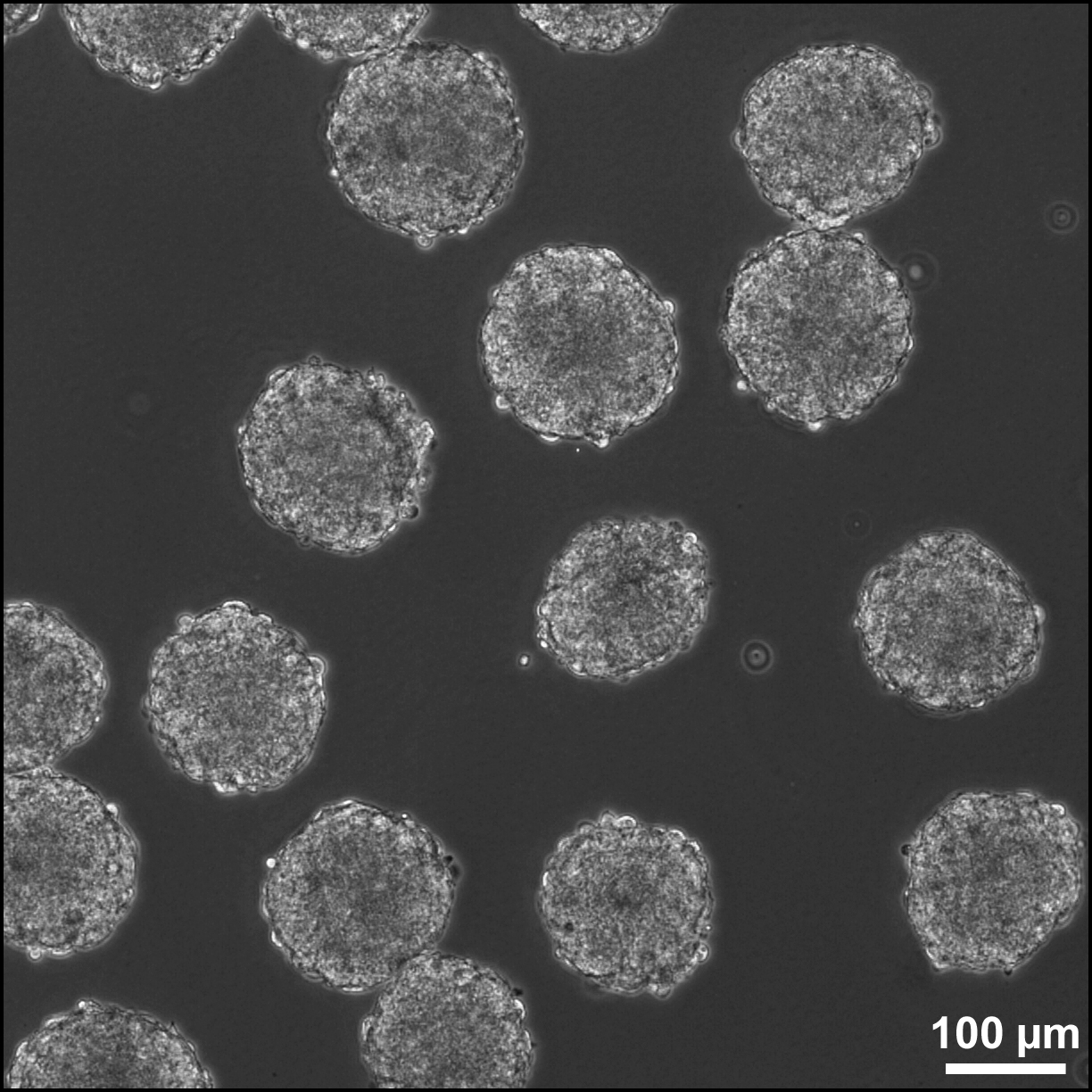
Phase image of EBs in suspension culture. Individual EBs are composed of approximately 1000 mESCs

An embryoid body whose cells differentiated into enhanced green fluorescence protein-expressing spontaneously beating cardiomyocytes.

Embryoid bodies (EBs) are three-dimensional aggregates formed by pluripotent stem cells. These include embryonic stem cells (ESC) and induced pluripotent stem cells (iPSC).

EBs are differentiation of human embryonic stem cells into embryoid bodies comprising the three embryonic germ layers. They mimic the characteristics seen in early-stage embryos. They are often used as a model system to conduct research on various aspects of developmental biology. They can also contribute to research focused on tissue engineering and regenerative medicine.

== Background ==
The pluripotent cell types that comprise embryoid bodies include embryonic stem cells (ESCs) derived from the blastocyst stage of embryos from mouse (mESC), primate, and human (hESC) sources. Additionally, EBs can be formed from embryonic stem cells derived through alternative techniques, including somatic cell nuclear transfer or the reprogramming of somatic cells to yield induced pluripotent stem cells (iPSC). Similar to ESCs cultured in monolayer formats, ESCs within embryoid bodies undergo differentiation and cell specification along the three germ lineages – endoderm, ectoderm, and mesoderm – which comprise all somatic cell types.

In contrast to monolayer cultures, however, the spheroid structures that are formed when ESCs aggregate enables the non-adherent culture of EBs in suspension, making EB cultures inherently scalable, which is useful for bioprocessing approaches, whereby large yields of cells can be produced for potential clinical applications. Additionally, although EBs largely exhibit heterogeneous patterns of differentiated cell types, ESCs are capable of responding to similar cues that direct embryonic development. Therefore, the three-dimensional structure, including the establishment of complex cell adhesions and paracrine signaling within the EB microenvironment, enables differentiation and morphogenesis which yields microtissues that are similar to native tissue structures. Such microtissues are promising to directly or indirectly repair damaged or diseased tissue in regenerative medicine applications, as well as for in vitro testing in the pharmaceutical industry and as a model of embryonic development.

== Formation ==
EBs are formed by the homophilic binding of the Ca2+ dependent adhesion molecule E-cadherin, which is highly expressed on undifferentiated ESCs. When cultured as single cells in the absence of anti-differentiation factors, ESCs spontaneously aggregate to form EBs. Such spontaneous formation is often accomplished in bulk suspension cultures whereby the dish is coated with non-adhesive materials, such as agar or hydrophilic polymers, to promote the preferential adhesion between single cells, rather than to the culture substrate. As hESC undergo apoptosis when cultured as single cells, EB formation often necessitates the use of inhibitors of the rho associated kinase (ROCK) pathway, including the small molecules Y-27632 and 2,4 disubstituted thiazole (Thiazovivin/Tzv). Alternatively, to avoid dissociation into single cells, EBs can be formed from hESCs by manual separation of adherent colonies (or regions of colonies) and subsequently cultured in suspension. Formation of EBs in suspension is amenable to the formation of large quantities of EBs, but provides little control over the size of the resulting aggregates, often leading to large, irregularly shaped EBs. As an alternative, the hydrodynamic forces imparted in mixed culture platforms increase the homogeneity of EB sizes when ESCs are inoculated within bulk suspensions.

Formation of EBs can also be more precisely controlled by the inoculation of known cell densities within single drops (10-20 μL) suspended from the lid of a Petri dish, known as hanging drops. While this method enables control of EB size by altering the number of cells per drop, the formation of hanging drops is labor-intensive and not easily amenable to scalable cultures. Additionally, the media can not be easily exchanged within the traditional hanging drop format, necessitating the transfer of hanging drops into bulk suspension cultures after 2–3 days of formation, whereby individual EBs tend to agglomerate. Recently, new technologies have been developed to enable media exchange within a modified hanging drop format. In addition, technologies have also been developed to physically separate cells by forced aggregation of ESCs within individual wells or confined on adhesive substrates, which enables increased throughput, controlled formation of EBs. Ultimately, the methods used for EB formation may impact the heterogeneity of EB populations, in terms of aggregation kinetics, EB size and yield, as well as differentiation trajectories.

== Differentiation within EBs ==
Within the context of ESC differentiation protocols, EB formation is often used as a method for initiating spontaneous differentiation toward the three germ lineages. EB differentiation begins with the specification of the exterior cells toward the primitive endoderm phenotype. The cells at the exterior then deposit extracellular matrix (ECM), containing collagen IV and laminin, similar to the composition and structure of basement membrane. In response to the ECM deposition, EBs often form a cystic cavity, whereby the cells in contact with the basement membrane remain viable and those at the interior undergo apoptosis, resulting in a fluid-filled cavity surrounded by cells. Subsequent differentiation proceeds to form derivatives of the three germ lineages. In the absence of supplements, the "default" differentiation of ESCs is largely toward ectoderm, and subsequent neural lineages. However, alternative media compositions, including the use of fetal bovine serum as well as defined growth factor additives, have been developed to promote the differentiation toward mesoderm and endoderm lineages.

As a result of the three-dimensional EB structure, complex morphogenesis occurs during EB differentiation, including the appearance of both epithelial- and mesenchymal-like cell populations, as well as the appearance of markers associated with the epithelial-mesenchymal transition (EMT). Additionally, the inductive effects resulting from signaling between cell populations in EBs results in spatially and temporally defined changes, which promote complex morphogenesis. Tissue-like structures are often exhibited within EBs, including the appearance of blood islands reminiscent of early blood vessel structures in the developing embryo, as well as the patterning of neurite extensions (indicative of neuron organization) and spontaneous contractile activity (indicative of cardiomyocyte differentiation) when EBs are plated onto adhesive substrates such as gelatin. More recently, complex structures, including optic cup-like structures were created in vitro resulting from EB differentiation.

== Parallels with embryonic development ==
Much of the research central to embryonic stem cell differentiation and morphogenesis is derived from studies in developmental biology and mammalian embryogenesis. For example, immediately after the blastocyst stage of development (from which ESCs are derived), the embryo undergoes differentiation, whereby cell specification of the inner cell mass results in the formation of the hypoblast and epiblast. Later on in postimplantation development, the anterior-posterior axis is formed and the embryo develops a transient structure known as the primitive streak. Much of the spatial patterning that occurs during the formation and migration of the primitive streak results from the secretion of agonists and antagonists by various cell populations, including the growth factors from the Wnt and transforming growth factor β (TGFβ) families (Lefty 1, Nodal), as well as repressors of the same molecules (Dkk-1, Sfrp1, Sfrp5). Due to the similarities between embryogenesis and ESC differentiation, many of the same growth factors are central to directed differentiation approaches.

In addition, advancements of EB culture resulted in the development of embryonic organoids (Gastruloids) which show remarkable parallels to embryonic development such as symmetry-breaking, localised brachyury expression, the formation of the embryonic axes (anteroposterior, dorsoventral and Left-Right) and gastrulation-like movements.

== Challenges to directing differentiation ==
In contrast to the differentiation of ESCs in monolayer cultures, whereby the addition of soluble morphogens and the extracellular microenvironment can be precisely and homogeneously controlled, the three-dimensional structure of EBs poses challenges to directed differentiation. For example, the visceral endoderm population which forms the exterior of EBs, creates an exterior "shell" consisting of tightly connected epithelial-like cells, as well as a dense ECM. Due to such physical restrictions, in combination with EB size, transport limitations occur within EBs, creating gradients of morphogens, metabolites, and nutrients. It has been estimated that oxygen transport is limited in cell aggregates larger than approximately 300 μm in diameter; however, the development of such gradients are also impacted by molecule size and cell uptake rates. Therefore, the delivery of morphogens to EBs results in increased heterogeneity and decreased efficiency of differentiated cell populations compared to monolayer cultures. One method of addressing transport limitations within EBs has been through polymeric delivery of morphogens from within the EB structure. Additionally, EBs can be cultured as individual microtissues and subsequently assembled into larger structures for tissue engineering applications. Although the complexity resulting from the three-dimensional adhesions and signaling may recapitulate more native tissue structures, it also creates challenges for understanding the relative contributions of mechanical, chemical, and physical signals to the resulting cell phenotypes and morphogenesis.

== See also ==
- Brain organoid
- Gastruloid
- Induced stem cells
- Pluripotency
