= LGR4 =

Protein-coding gene in the species Homo sapiens

Identifiers
- Aliases: LGR4, BNMD17, GPR48, leucine-rich repeat containing G protein-coupled receptor 4, leucine rich repeat containing G protein-coupled receptor 4, DPSL
- External IDs: OMIM: 606666; MGI: 1891468; GeneCards: LGR4
Available structures
PDB	Ortholog search: PDBe RCSB
PDB	List of PDB id codes 4KT1, 4QXE, 4QXF

Gene location (Human)
Chr.	Chromosome 11 (human)
Band	11p14.1	Start	27,365,961 bp
Band	11p14.1	End	27,472,790 bp

Gene location (Mouse)
Chr.	Chromosome 2 (mouse)
Band	2|2 E3	Start	109,747,992 bp
Band	2|2 E3	End	109,844,602 bp
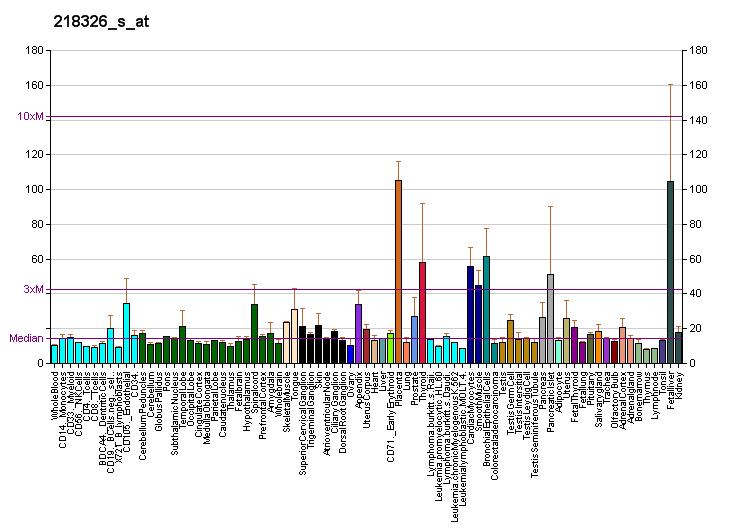
RNA expression pattern
Bgee	Human / Mouse (ortholog); Top expressed in: body of pancreas; hair follicle; gingival epithelium; rectum; decidua; mucosa of colon; mucosa of sigmoid colon; Epithelium of choroid plexus; metanephros; metanephric glomerulus / Top expressed in: hand; otolith organ; epithelium of lens; utricle; renal corpuscle; ciliary body; Gonadal ridge; left colon; epithelium of stomach; migratory enteric neural crest cell; More reference expression data
BioGPS	More reference expression data
Gene ontology
Molecular function	signal transducer activity; protein binding; transmembrane signaling receptor activity; G protein-coupled receptor activity; protein-hormone receptor activity; G protein-coupled peptide receptor activity
Cellular component	integral component of membrane; membrane; integral component of plasma membrane; plasma membrane
Biological process	hair follicle development; G protein-coupled receptor signaling pathway; cell differentiation; positive regulation of branching involved in ureteric bud morphogenesis; male genitalia development; metanephric nephron tubule morphogenesis; rhythmic process; metanephric glomerulus development; immune system process; epithelial cell proliferation; Wnt signaling pathway; tube morphogenesis; positive regulation of transcription, DNA-templated; multicellular organism development; cell differentiation involved in metanephros development; intestinal stem cell homeostasis; epithelial cell proliferation involved in renal tubule morphogenesis; circadian rhythm; canonical Wnt signaling pathway involved in metanephric kidney development; digestive tract development; innate immune response; negative regulation of transcription, DNA-templated; signal transduction; positive regulation of canonical Wnt signaling pathway; bone remodeling; circadian regulation of gene expression; spermatogenesis; osteoblast differentiation; bone mineralization; negative regulation of toll-like receptor signaling pathway; adenylate cyclase-activating G protein-coupled receptor signaling pathway; activation of adenylate cyclase activity; hormone-mediated signaling pathway; negative regulation of cold-induced thermogenesis
Sources:Amigo / QuickGO
Orthologs
Databases	NCBI: entry; OMA: entry
Species	Human	Mouse
Entrez	55366	107515
Ensembl	ENSG00000205213	ENSMUSG00000050199
UniProt	Q9BXB1	A2ARI4
RefSeq (mRNA)	NM_018490; NM_001346432	NM_172671
RefSeq (protein)	NP_001333361; NP_060960	NP_766259
Location (UCSC)	Chr 11: 27.37 – 27.47 Mb	Chr 2: 109.75 – 109.84 Mb
PubMed search
- Wikidata
View/Edit Human	View/Edit Mouse

Leucine-rich repeat-containing G-protein coupled receptor 4 is a protein that in humans is encoded by the LGR4 gene. LGR4 is known to have a role in the development of the male reproductive tract, eyelids, hair and bone.

Mutations in this gene have been associated to osteoporosis (doi:10.1038/nature12124).
