= Kenro Kusumi =

Genome biologist and professor at Arizona State University

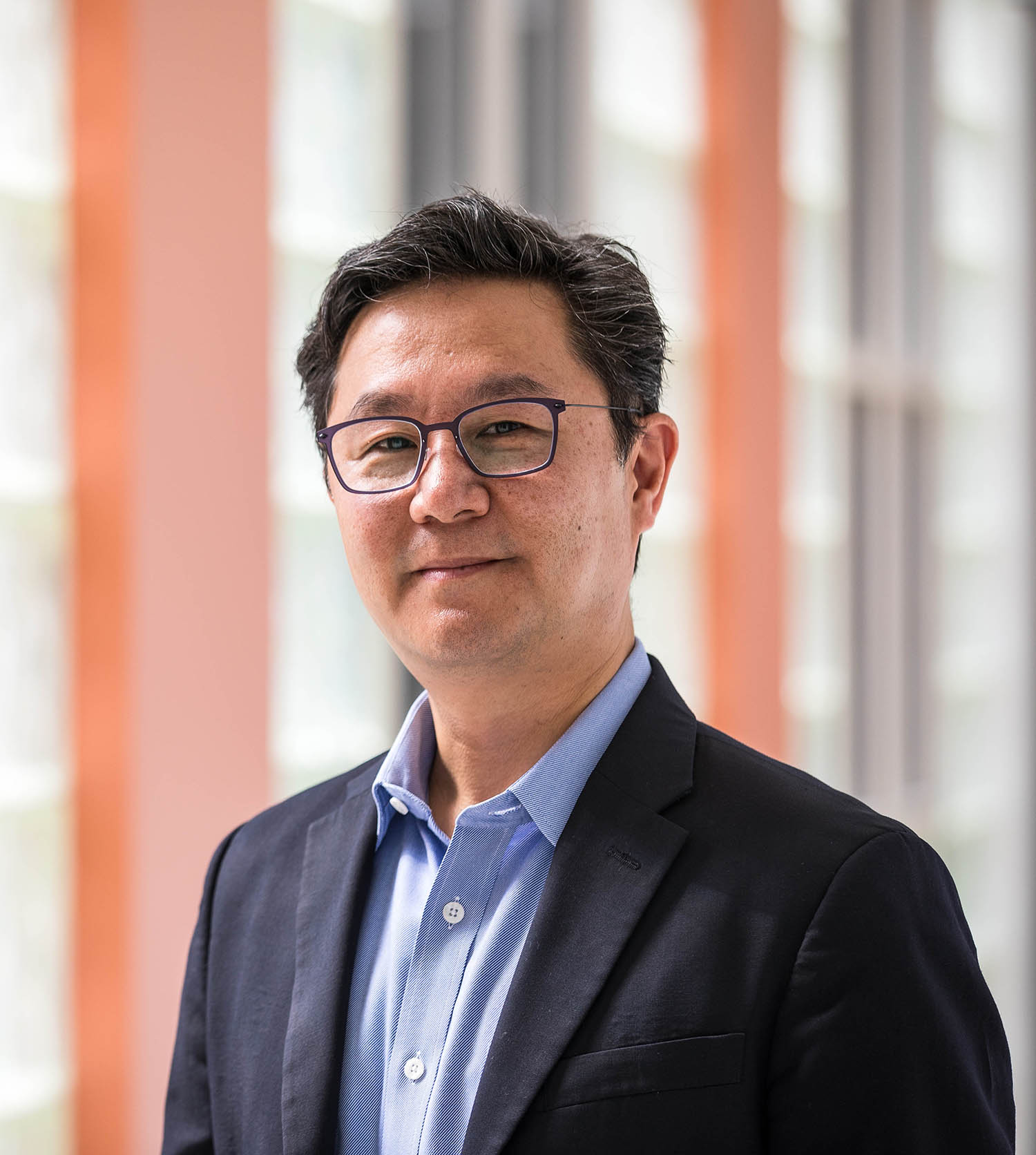
- Title: Dean of The College of Liberal Arts and Sciences at Arizona State University
- Spouse: Stephen Pratt

Academic background
- Education: Harvard College (AB), Massachusetts Institute of Technology (PhD)

Academic work
- Discipline: Genome biologist

Kenro Kusumi is a genome biologist and professor, dean of The College of Liberal Arts and Sciences and senior vice provost at Arizona State University.

== Early life and education ==
Kusumi was raised in Raleigh and attended high school at the North Carolina School of Science and Mathematics in Durham, where he was a 1984 national winner of the NASA Space Shuttle Student Involvement Project. Kusumi received his AB in Biochemical Sciences from Harvard College in 1988 and PhD in Biology from the Massachusetts Institute of Technology (MIT) in 1997 with doctoral advisor Eric S. Lander. He was a Hitchings-Elion Fellow of the Burroughs Wellcome Fund in the laboratory of developmental biologist Robb Krumlauf at the National Institute for Medical Research in London.

== Career ==
Kusumi was assistant professor at the University of Pennsylvania and The Children's Hospital of Philadelphia from 2001 to 2006, where he served as Director of Pediatric Orthopaedic Basic Science Research. He and his collaborators had used genomic approaches to identify the first genetic cause of the congenital spinal disorder, spondylocostal dysostosis, caused by mutations in delta-like 3 (DLL3), and he contributed to subsequent research identifying mutations in the LFNG and HES7 genes for related congenital axial skeletal disorders.

Kusumi is the dean of The College of Liberal Arts and Sciences and senior vice provost at Arizona State University. Prior, he served as the dean of natural sciences in The College of Liberal Arts and Sciences from 2021 to 2024. He has also held the position of Associate Dean in The College of Liberal Arts and Sciences at Arizona State University. From 2019 to 2021, he was Director of ASU's School of Life Sciences, the university's first interdisciplinary school established in 2003.

Kusumi is a member of the LGBTQIA+ community. He serves as mentor in ASU's HUES program and GRADient organization for gender and sexual minority graduate students and their allies.

Kusumi's research at ASU uses genome biology to help conserve and study the functional adaptations of reptiles. Kusumi has sequenced the genome of the threatened Mojave desert tortoise (Gopherus agassizii) as a tool for conservation efforts. Kusumi has led the first genome-scale analysis of accelerated evolution associated with the anole lizard's functional adaptations. His group has also uncovered sets of genes that are critical in the ability of anole lizards to adapt and regenerate parts of their bodies.

== Personal life ==
Kusumi is married to Stephen Pratt, professor at Arizona State University.
