= Clock and wavefront model =

The clock and wavefront model is a model used to describe the process of somitogenesis in vertebrates. Somitogenesis is the process by which somites, blocks of mesoderm that give rise to a variety of connective tissues, are formed.

The model describes the splitting off of somites from the paraxial mesoderm as the result of oscillating expression of particular proteins and their gradients.

== Overview ==
Once the cells of the pre-somitic mesoderm are in place following by cell migration during gastrulation, oscillatory expression of many genes begins in these cells as if regulated by a developmental "clock". This has led many to conclude that somitogenesis is coordinated by a "clock and wave" mechanism.

More technically, this means that somitogenesis occurs due to the largely cell-autonomous oscillations of a network of genes and gene products which causes cells to oscillate between a permissive and a non-permissive state in a consistently timed-fashion, like a clock. These genes include members of the FGF family, Wnt and Notch pathway, as well as targets of these pathways. The wavefront progresses slowly in an anterior-to-posterior direction. As the wavefront of signaling comes in contact with cells in the permissive state, they undergo a mesenchymal-epithelial transition and pinch off of the more anterior pre-somitic mesoderm, forming a somite boundary and resetting the process for the next somite.

In particular, the cyclic activation of the Notch pathway appears to be of great importance in the wavefront-clock model. It has been suggested that the activation of Notch cyclically activates a cascade of genes necessary for the somites to separate from the main paraxial body. This is controlled by different means in different species, such as through a simple negative feedback loop in zebrafish or in a complicated process in which FGF and Wnt clocks affect the Notch clock, as in chicks and mice. Generally speaking, the segmentation clock model is highly evolutionarily conserved.

Intrinsic expression of “clock genes” must oscillate with a periodicity equal to the time necessary for one somite to form, for example 30 minutes in zebrafish, 90 minutes in chicks, and 100 minutes in snakes.

== Oscillation autonomy ==
Gene oscillation in presomitic cells is largely, but not completely, cell autonomous. When Notch signaling is disrupted in zebrafish, neighboring cells no longer oscillate synchronously, indicating that Notch signaling is important for keeping neighboring populations of cells synchronous. In addition, some cellular inter-dependency has been displayed in studies concerning the protein Sonic hedgehog (Shh) in somitogenesis. Although expression of Shh pathway proteins has not been reported to oscillate in the pre-somitic mesoderm, they are expressed within the pre-somitic mesoderm during somitogenesis. When the notochord is ablated during somitogenesis in the chick embryo, the proper number of somites forms, but the segmentation clock is delayed for the posterior two thirds of the somites. The anterior somites are not affected. In one study, this phenotype was mimicked by Shh inhibitors, and timely somite formation was rescued by exogenous Shh protein, showing that the missing signal produced by the notochord is mediated by Shh.

== See also ==
- Segmentation
- Gastrulation
- Signal transduction
