= HES7 =

Protein-coding gene in humans

Identifiers
- Aliases: HES7, SCDO4, bHLHb37, hes family bHLH transcription factor 7, HES7 gene
- External IDs: OMIM: 608059; MGI: 2135679; GeneCards: HES7

Gene location (Human)
| Chr. | Chromosome 17 (human) |
| Band | 17p13.1 | Start | 8,120,592 bp |
| Band | 17p13.1 | End | 8,124,106 bp |
RNA expression pattern
| Bgee | Human / Mouse (ortholog); Top expressed in: right hemisphere of cerebellum; stromal cell of endometrium; apex of heart; right frontal lobe; ganglionic eminence; Brodmann area 9; anterior cingulate cortex; ventricular zone; tibial nerve; left ventricle / n/a; More reference expression data |
| BioGPS | n/a |
Gene ontology
| Molecular function | DNA binding; protein dimerization activity; transcription factor binding; RNA polymerase II transcription regulatory region sequence-specific DNA binding; DNA-binding transcription factor activity, RNA polymerase II-specific; DNA-binding transcription repressor activity, RNA polymerase II-specific; transcription corepressor activity; sequence-specific DNA binding; sequence-specific double-stranded DNA binding |
| Cellular component | nucleus |
| Biological process | Notch signaling pathway; multicellular organism development; rhythmic process; somitogenesis; mesoderm development; regulation of transcription, DNA-templated; negative regulation of transcription by RNA polymerase II; skeletal system development; post-anal tail morphogenesis; transcription, DNA-templated; regulation of somitogenesis; negative regulation of transcription, DNA-templated; cell differentiation; regulation of neurogenesis; anterior/posterior pattern specification |
Sources:Amigo / QuickGO
Orthologs
| Databases | NCBI: entry; OMA: entry |
| Species | Human | Mouse |
| Entrez | 84667 | 84653 |
| Ensembl | ENSG00000179111 | n/a |
| UniProt | Q9BYE0 | Q8BKT2 |
| RefSeq (mRNA) | NM_001165967; NM_032580 | NM_033041 |
| RefSeq (protein) | NP_001159439; NP_115969 | NP_149030; NP_001388436 |
| Location (UCSC) | Chr 17: 8.12 – 8.12 Mb | n/a |
| PubMed search |
- Wikidata
| View/Edit Human | View/Edit Mouse |

(HES7) or bHLHb37 is a protein coding mammalian gene found on chromosome 17 in humans. HES7 is a member of the Hairy and Enhancer of Split families of Basic helix-loop-helix proteins. The gene product is a transcription factor and is expressed cyclically in the presomitic mesoderm as part of the Notch signalling pathway. HES7 is involved in the segmentation of somites from the presomitic mesoderm in vertebrates. The HES7 gene is self-regulated by a negative feedback loop in which the gene product can bind to its own promoter. This causes the gene to be expressed in an oscillatory manner. The HES7 protein also represses expression of Lunatic Fringe (LFNG) thereby both directly and indirectly regulating the Notch signalling pathway. Mutations in HES7 can result in deformities of the spine, ribs and heart. Spondylocostal dysostosis is a common disease caused by mutations in the HES7 gene. The inheritance pattern of Spondylocostal dysostosis is autosomal recessive.

== Gene ==
The HES7 transcription factor belongs to the Hairy and Enhancer of split families of bHLH transcription factors. The gene that encodes the human HES7 protein is 5kb long and is found on chromosome 17, on the short arm at position 13.1. from base pair 8,120,590 to 8,126,032. In mice, HES7 is located on chromosome 11. HES7 has 62 known orthologues. The HES7 gene is expressed in the presomitic mesoderm where expression fluctuates in two hour cycles. HES7 is regulated by the Notch signalling pathway that functions in vertebrates and invertebrates by mediating cell fate and differentiation.

The HES7 gene product functions to repress expression of genes with promoters containing an N-box or E-box. HES7 also has been shown to negatively regulate expression of genes activated by the E47 transcription factor. HES7 regulates its own expression through a negative feedback loop by binding to its own promoter. This feedback mechanism allows the HES7 protein to accumulate and be degraded so that its expression oscillates in a two-hour cycle. HES7 also negatively regulates Lunatic Fringe protein (Lfng). Lfng encodes an acetylglucosaminyl transferase that regulates expression in the Notch signalling pathway. By self-regulating and regulating the Lfng protein, HES7 both directly and indirectly alters expression in the Notch signalling pathway.

=== Mutations ===
Several mutations in HES7 have been associated with disease.

==== Common mutations in humans ====
Mutations to HES7 can lead to abnormalities in formation of heart, vertebral and neural tube. Homozygous mutations in HES7 have been associated with spondylocostal dystostosis and dextrocardia. Dextrocardia may be accompanied by situs invertus. A single nucleotide mutation in the 3'UTR has been associated with Coats Plus Syndrome in addition to Dextrocardia.

==== Animal models ====
Studies of animal embryos have linked mutations in HES7 to congenital scoliosis. In canines, exonic deletions in HES7 have been shown to mirror human disease and cause spondylocostal dystostosis in miniature Schnauzer dogs. Missense mutations in HES7 have been linked to short and kinked tails in Asian Domestic Cats. Homozygotes for a V2A missense mutation in a conserved vertebrate sequence of HES7 resulted in kinked tails while heterozygotes for the mutation presented with moderately kinked tails.

== Protein ==
Studies with mouse HES7 have demonstrated that the gene contains 4 exons. There are three known human HES7 variants due to alternative splicing. The gene product is a transcription factor protein. The Helix-loop-helix domain is located at the N-terminal end of the protein. Both the human and the mouse protein have been shown to contain 225 amino acids and feature an orange domain as well as a conserved sequence of four amino acids at the C-terminal end. The four amino acids are Tryptophan-Arginine-Proline-Tryptophan. This conserved sequence of four amino acids binds Groucho/TLE family members. Groucho/TLE are transcriptional corepressors. Hairy-related proteins can direct these transcriptional corepressors to target genes. Orange domains are motifs of ~35 amino acids that are found on the C-terminal side of basic helix-loop-helix domains in some transcription factors in eukaryotic organisms. Proteins with Orange domains are divided into four subfamilies, three in which all proteins contain a basic helix-loop-helix domain. The subfamilies that contain Orange domains and basic helix-loop-helix domains are Hairy, Enhancer of Split, and Hey. Transcription factors with Orange domains bind DNA and regulate biological processes such as cell differentiation and embryonic patterning.

== Function ==
The HES7 protein is a transcription factor that functions as a transcriptional repressor. It is involved in somitogenesis, an important cycle in vertebrate development. Somitogenesis involves the early segmentation of vertebrates. HES7 is involved in segmenting the presomitic mesoderm into somites. Oscillating expression of HES7 in the presomitic mesoderm occurs in a two-hour cycle and is regulated by a negative feedback loop. This cycle of accumulation and degradation of the HES7 protein has been proposed as the basis for the somite segmentation clock. The cyclic nature of HES7 relies on proteasome-mediated degradation. Each cycle of HES7 expression coincides with the formation of a pair of somites. The half life of the HES7 protein is thought to be essential for proper function of the HES7 gene. The importance of accuracy in the two hour expression cycle was highlighted in an experiment where mice expressing HES7 with a mutation that allowed for a longer half life while retaining normal repressor function presented with abnormal segmentation. The 3'UTR was demonstrated as necessary for sufficient accumulation of HES7 protein to function. This was determined when transcripts with an improperly spliced intron in the 3'UTR were degraded prematurely. The correct number of introns has also been demonstrated as necessary to maintain the cyclic rhythm. Shortening the delay in accumulation of the HES7 protein by reducing the number of introns resulted in an increased number of somites.

== Related conditions ==
Nonfunctional HES7 protein results in errors in segmentation of the presomitic mesoderm. Mutations can result in malformed spine, ribs, heart and neural tube. The following conditions can result from errors in segmentation due to mutations in HES7:

- Spondylocostal dysostosis is characterized by abnormalities of the spine and ribs. Vertebrae may be fused together or abnormally shaped. Rib bones also may be fused together or missing entirely. These abnormalities can result in scoliosis. These symptoms lead to dwarfism where an individual has a shortened body length with legs and arms of regular length. The inheritance pattern of Spondylocostal dysostosis is autosomal recessive.
- Dextrocardia is characterized by the heart pointing to the right side of the chest, when it normally points to the left. Dextrocardia may or may not be accompanied by situs inversus.
- Dextrocardia with situs inversus results when, in addition to the heart, the major visceral organs of the body form in the mirror image of their normal positioning.
- Scoliosis is characterized by a curvature of the spine. The curve may be C-shaped or S-shaped.
- Spina bifida is a neural tube defect. It is characterized by a malformed spine when the neural tube does not properly close correctly. Spina bifida may cause physical and intellectual disability. Types of spina bifida that have been documented in individuals homozygous for mutations in HES7 are spina bifida occulta and myelomeningocele.
- Chiari malformation results from neural tube defects and affects the base of the skull and the cerebellum. With Chiari malformation, the cerebellum extends lower than the base of the skull into the upper spinal canal.
