= RIPPLY1 =

Protein-coding gene in humans

Identifiers
- Aliases: RIPPLY1, ripply transcriptional repressor 1
- External IDs: OMIM: 300575; GeneCards: RIPPLY1

Gene location (Human)
| Chr. | X chromosome (human) |
| Band | Xq22.3 | Start | 106,900,063 bp |
| Band | Xq22.3 | End | 106,903,341 bp |
RNA expression pattern
| Bgee | Human / Mouse (ortholog); Top expressed in: testicle; gonad; right lobe of liver; human kidney; right adrenal gland; right adrenal cortex; left adrenal gland; left adrenal cortex; gastric mucosa; mucosa of transverse colon / n/a; More reference expression data |
| BioGPS | n/a |
Gene ontology
| Molecular function | protein binding |
| Cellular component | nucleus |
| Biological process | multicellular organism development; somite specification; negative regulation of transcription, DNA-templated; regulation of transcription, DNA-templated; negative regulation of transcription by RNA polymerase II; embryonic pattern specification; transcription, DNA-templated; somite rostral/caudal axis specification |
Sources:Amigo / QuickGO
Orthologs
| Databases | NCBI: entry; OMA: entry |
| Species | Human | Mouse |
| Entrez | 92129 | n/a |
| Ensembl | ENSG00000147223 | n/a |
| UniProt | Q0D2K3 | n/a |
| RefSeq (mRNA) | NM_138382; NM_001171706 | n/a |
| RefSeq (protein) | NP_001165177; NP_612391 | n/a |
| Location (UCSC) | Chr X: 106.9 – 106.9 Mb | n/a |
| PubMed search | | n/a |
- Wikidata
| View/Edit Human |

Ripply transcriptional repressor 1 is a protein that in humans is encoded by the RIPPLY1 gene. RIPPLY1 is a nuclear transcriptional corepressor involved in early embryonic development and somite formation.
