= MESP2 =

Protein-coding gene in the species Homo sapiens

Identifiers
- Aliases: MESP2, SCDO2, bHLHc6, mesoderm posterior bHLH transcription factor 2
- External IDs: OMIM: 605195; MGI: 1096325; GeneCards: MESP2

Gene location (Human)
Chr.	Chromosome 15 (human)
Band	15q26.1	Start	89,760,591 bp
Band	15q26.1	End	89,778,754 bp

Gene location (Mouse)
Chr.	Chromosome 7 (mouse)
Band	7 D2|7 45.18 cM	Start	79,460,475 bp
Band	7 D2|7 45.18 cM	End	79,463,187 bp
RNA expression pattern
Bgee	Human / Mouse (ortholog); Top expressed in: gonad; testicle; buccal mucosa cell; lower lobe of lung; mucosa of transverse colon; skin of thigh; prefrontal cortex; palpebral conjunctiva; Brodmann area 9; nucleus accumbens / Top expressed in: zygote; secondary oocyte; primary oocyte; urethra; female urethra; male urethra; embryo; spermatocyte; embryo; morula; More reference expression data
BioGPS	n/a
Gene ontology
Molecular function	DNA binding; protein dimerization activity; RNA polymerase II cis-regulatory region sequence-specific DNA binding; DNA-binding transcription activator activity, RNA polymerase II-specific; DNA-binding transcription factor activity, RNA polymerase II-specific; DNA-binding transcription factor activity
Cellular component	nucleus
Biological process	Notch signaling pathway; multicellular organism development; regulation of transcription, DNA-templated; transcription, DNA-templated; mesoderm formation; somitogenesis; heart morphogenesis; transcription by RNA polymerase II; embryonic pattern specification; positive regulation of transcription by RNA polymerase II; regulation of transcription by RNA polymerase II
Sources:Amigo / QuickGO
Orthologs
Databases	NCBI: entry; OMA: entry
Species	Human	Mouse
Entrez	145873	17293
Ensembl	ENSG00000188095	ENSMUSG00000030543
UniProt	Q0VG99	O08574
RefSeq (mRNA)	NM_001039958	NM_008589
RefSeq (protein)	NP_001035047	NP_032615
Location (UCSC)	Chr 15: 89.76 – 89.78 Mb	Chr 7: 79.46 – 79.46 Mb
PubMed search
- Wikidata
View/Edit Human	View/Edit Mouse

Mesoderm posterior protein 2 (MESP2), also known as class C basic helix-loop-helix protein 6 (bHLHc6), is a protein that in humans is encoded by the MESP2 gene.

== Function ==
This gene encodes a member of the bHLH family of transcription factors and plays a key role in defining the rostrocaudal patterning of somites via interactions with multiple Notch signaling pathways. This gene is expressed in the anterior presomitic mesoderm and is downregulated immediately after the formation of segmented somites. This gene also plays a role in the formation of epithelial somitic mesoderm and cardiac mesoderm. In zebrafish, the homolog mesp-b is critical for dermomyotome development.

== Clinical significance ==
Mutations in the MESP2 gene cause autosomal recessive Spondylocostal dysostosis type 2.
