= Muscle =

Biological tissue that allows movement

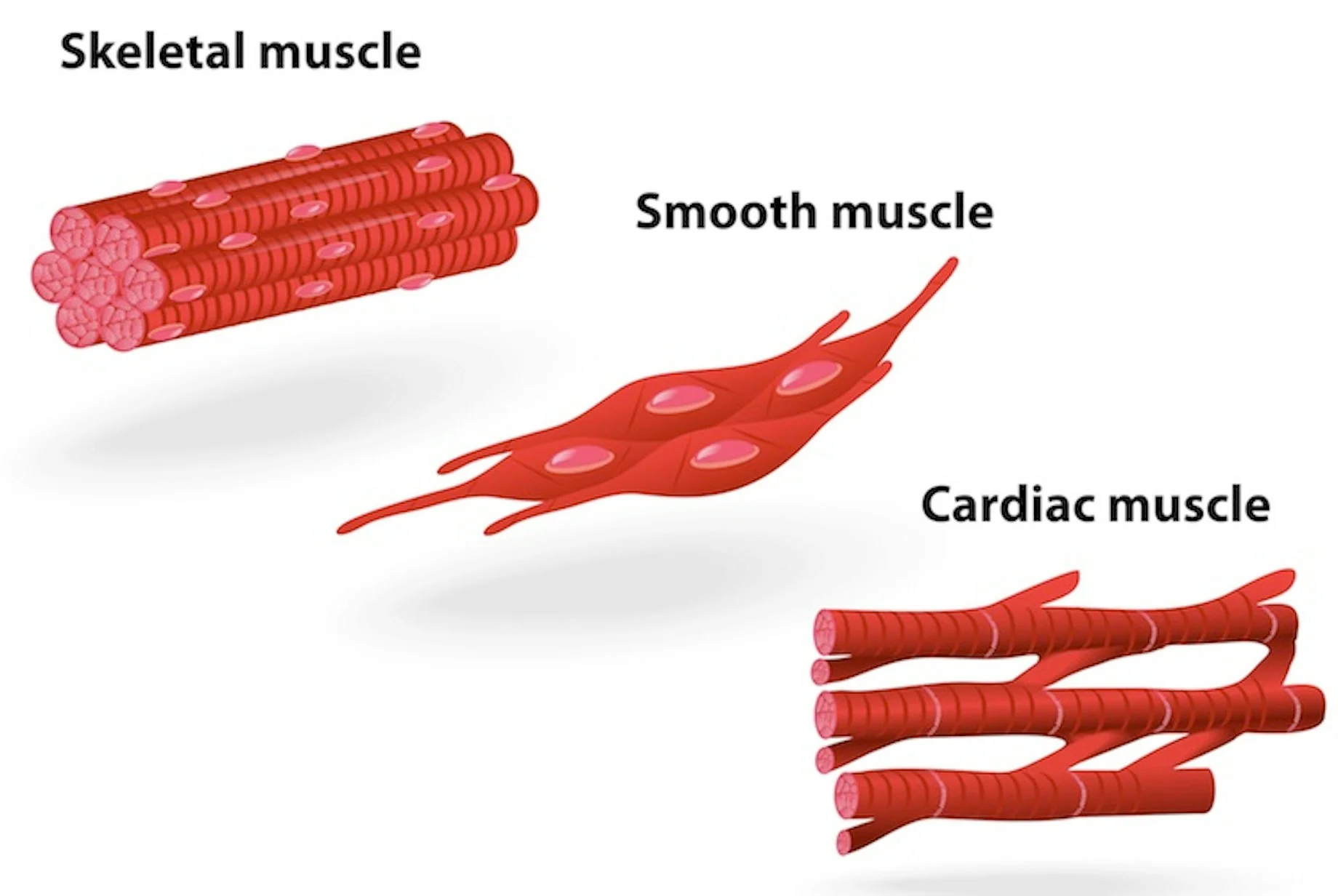
- Three distinct types of muscle (L to R): skeletal, smooth (non-striated), and cardiac muscle.

Identifiers
- MeSH: D009132
- TA2: 1975, 1994
- FMA: 5022 30316, 5022

Muscle is a specialised soft tissue, one of the four basic types of animal tissues. There are three types of muscle tissues in vertebrates: skeletal muscle tissue, cardiac muscle tissue, and smooth muscle tissue. Muscle tissue gives skeletal muscles the ability to contract and relax. Muscle tissue contains special contractile proteins called actin and myosin which interact to cause movement. Among many other muscle proteins present are two regulatory proteins, troponin and tropomyosin. Muscle is formed during embryonic development, in a process known as myogenesis.

Skeletal muscle tissue is striated, consisting of elongated, multinucleate muscle cells called muscle fibers, and is responsible for movements of the body. Other tissues in skeletal muscle include tendons and perimysium. Smooth and cardiac muscle contract involuntarily, without conscious intervention. These muscle types may be activated both through the interaction of the central nervous system as well as by innervation from peripheral plexus or endocrine (hormonal) activation. Skeletal muscle only contracts voluntarily, under the influence of the central nervous system. Reflexes are a form of non-conscious activation of skeletal muscles, but nonetheless arise through activation of the central nervous system, albeit not engaging cortical structures until after the contraction has occurred.

The different muscle types vary in their response to neurotransmitters and hormones such as acetylcholine, noradrenaline, adrenaline, and nitric oxide which depends on muscle type and the exact location of the muscle.

Sub-categorization of muscle tissue is also possible, depending on among other things the content of myoglobin, mitochondria, and myosin ATPase, etc.

== Etymology ==
The word muscle comes from Latin musculus, diminutive of mus meaning mouse, because the appearance of the flexed biceps resembles the back of a mouse.

The same etymology is found in Greek, in which μῦς, mȳs, means both "mouse" and "muscle".

== Structure ==
There are three types of muscle tissue in vertebrates: skeletal, cardiac, and smooth. Skeletal and cardiac muscle are types of striated muscle tissue. Smooth muscle is non-striated.

There are three types of muscle tissue in invertebrates that are based on their pattern of striation: transversely striated, obliquely striated, and smooth muscle. In arthropods there is no smooth muscle. The transversely striated type is the most similar to the skeletal muscle in vertebrates.

Vertebrate skeletal muscle tissue is an elongated, striated muscle tissue, with the fibres ranging from a few millimeters to several inches in length and from 10 to 100 micrometers in width. Skeletal striated muscle tissue is arranged in regular, parallel bundles of myofibrils, which contain many contractile units known as sarcomeres, which give the tissue its striated (striped) appearance. Skeletal muscle is voluntary muscle, anchored by tendons or sometimes by aponeuroses to bones, and is used to affect skeletal movement such as locomotion and to maintain posture. Postural control is generally maintained as an unconscious reflex, but the responsible muscles can also react to conscious control. The body mass of an average adult man is made up of 42% of skeletal muscle, and an average adult woman is made up of 36%.

Cardiac muscle tissue is found only in the walls of the heart as myocardium, and it is an involuntary muscle controlled by the autonomic nervous system. Cardiac muscle tissue is striated like skeletal muscle, containing sarcomeres in highly regular arrangements of bundles. While skeletal muscles are arranged in regular, parallel bundles, cardiac muscle connects at branching, irregular angles known as intercalated discs.

Smooth muscle tissue is non-striated and involuntary. Smooth muscle is found within the walls of organs and structures such as the esophagus, stomach, intestines, bronchi, uterus, urethra, bladder, blood vessels, and the arrector pili in the skin that control the erection of body hair.

=== Comparison of types ===
	smooth muscle	cardiac muscle	skeletal muscle
Anatomy
Neuromuscular junction	none		present
Fibers	fusiform, short (<0.4 mm)	branching	cylindrical, long (<15 cm)
Mitochondria		numerous	many to few (by type)
Nuclei	1	1	>1
Sarcomeres	none	present, max. length 2.6 μm	present, max. length 3.7 μm
Syncytium	none (independent cells)	none (but functional as such)	present
Sarcoplasmic reticulum	little elaborated	moderately elaborated	highly elaborated
ATPase	little	moderate	abundant
Physiology
Self-regulation	spontaneous action (slow)	yes (rapid)	none (requires nerve stimulus)
Response to stimulus	unresponsive	"all-or-nothing"	"all-or-nothing"
Action potential	yes	yes	yes
Workspace	Force/length curve is variable	the increase in the force/length curve	at the peak of the force/length curve
Response to stimulus

=== Skeletal muscle ===
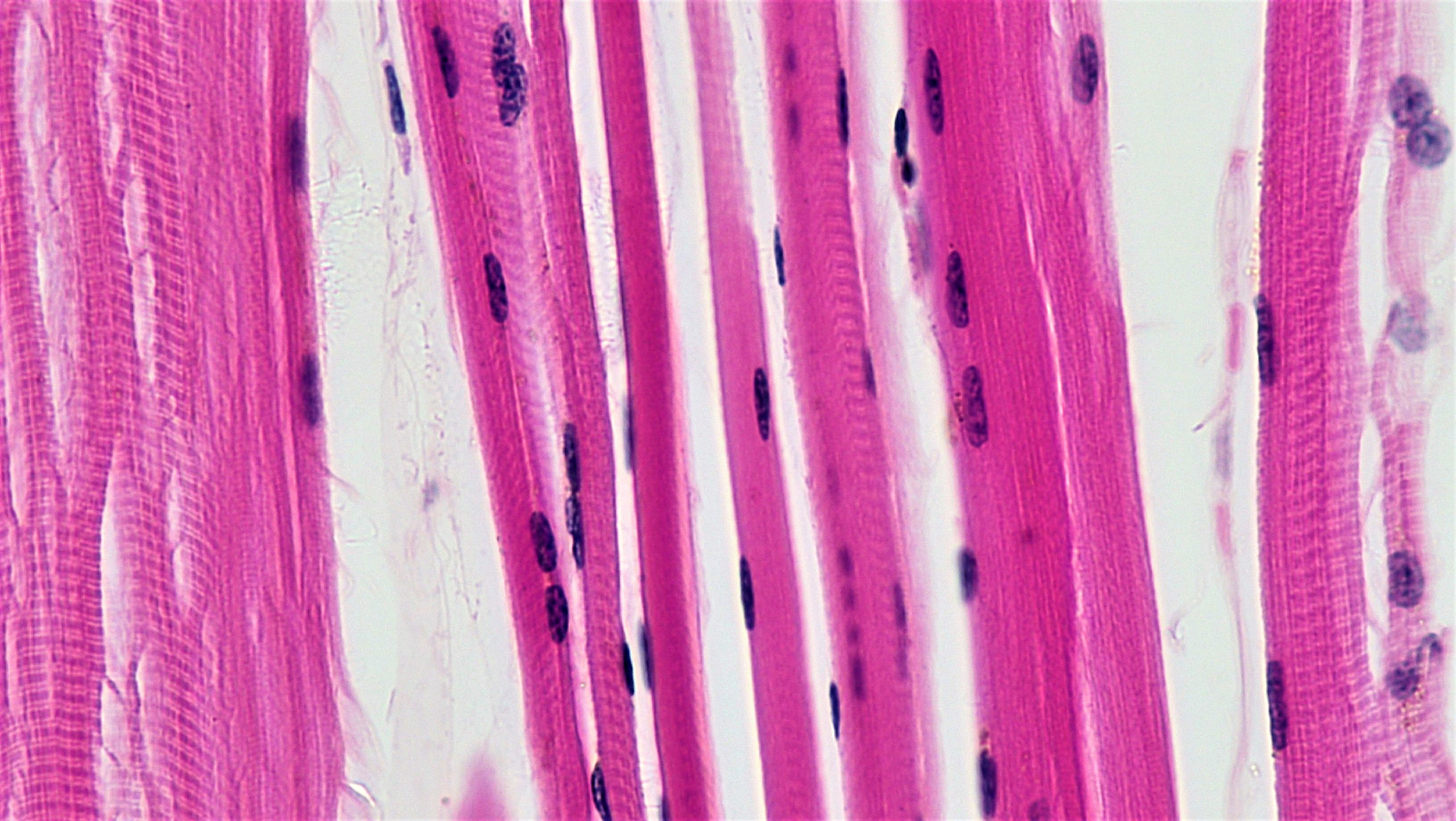
Striated skeletal muscle cells in microscopic view

Skeletal muscle is broadly classified into two fiber types: type I (slow-twitch) and type II (fast-twitch).

- Type I, slow-twitch, slow oxidative, or red muscle is dense with capillaries and is rich in mitochondria and myoglobin, giving the muscle tissue its characteristic red color. It can carry more oxygen and sustain aerobic activity.
- Type II, fast-twitch muscle, has three major kinds that are, in order of increasing contractile speed:
  - Type IIa, which, like a slow muscle, is aerobic, rich in mitochondria and capillaries and appears red when deoxygenated.
  - Type IIx (also known as type IId), which is less dense in mitochondria and myoglobin. This is the fastest muscle type in humans. It can contract more quickly and with a greater amount of force than oxidative muscle, but can sustain only short, anaerobic bursts of activity before muscle contraction becomes painful (often incorrectly attributed to a build-up of lactic acid). N.B. in some books and articles this muscle in humans was, confusingly, called type IIB.
  - Type IIb, which is anaerobic, glycolytic, "white" muscle that is even less dense in mitochondria and myoglobin. In small animals like rodents, this is the major fast muscle type, explaining the pale color of their flesh. In laboratory house mice, an intronic single nucleotide polymorphism in the Myosin heavy polypeptide 4 gene causes a great reduction in the amount of Type IIb muscle, yielding the "Mini-Muscle" phenotype, which was discovered based on its greatly reduced (~50%) hind-limb muscle mass.

The density of mammalian skeletal muscle tissue is about 1.06 kg/liter. This can be contrasted with the density of adipose tissue (fat), which is 0.9196 kg/liter. This makes muscle tissue approximately 15% denser than fat tissue.

Skeletal muscle is a highly oxygen-consuming tissue, and oxidative DNA damage that is induced by reactive oxygen species tends to accumulate with age. The oxidative DNA damage 8-OHdG accumulates in heart and skeletal muscle of both mouse and rat with age. Also, DNA double-strand breaks accumulate with age in the skeletal muscle of mice.

=== Smooth muscle ===
Smooth muscle is involuntary and non-striated. It is divided into two subgroups: the single-unit (unitary) and multiunit smooth muscle. Within single-unit cells, the whole bundle or sheet contracts as a syncytium (i.e. a multinucleate mass of cytoplasm that is not separated into cells). Multiunit smooth muscle tissues innervate individual cells; as such, they allow for fine control and gradual responses, much like motor unit recruitment in skeletal muscle.

Smooth muscle is found within the walls of blood vessels (such smooth muscle specifically being termed vascular smooth muscle) such as in the tunica media layer of the large (aorta) and small arteries, arterioles and veins. Smooth muscle is also found in lymphatic vessels, the urinary bladder, uterus (termed uterine smooth muscle), male and female reproductive tracts, the gastrointestinal tract, the respiratory tract, the arrector pili of skin, the ciliary muscle, and the iris of the eye. The structure and function is basically the same in smooth muscle cells in different organs, but the inducing stimuli differ substantially, in order to perform individual actions in the body at individual times. In addition, the glomeruli of the kidneys contain smooth muscle-like cells called mesangial cells.

=== Cardiac muscle ===
Cardiac muscle is involuntary, striated muscle that is found in the walls and the histological foundation of the heart, specifically the myocardium. The cardiac muscle cells, (also called cardiomyocytes or myocardiocytes), predominantly contain only one nucleus, although populations with two to four nuclei do exist. The myocardium is the muscle tissue of the heart and forms a thick middle layer between the outer epicardium layer and the inner endocardium layer.

Coordinated contractions of cardiac muscle cells in the heart propel blood out of the atria and ventricles to the blood vessels of the left/body/systemic and right/lungs/pulmonary circulatory systems. This complex mechanism illustrates systole of the heart.

Cardiac muscle cells, unlike most other tissues in the body, rely on an available blood and electrical supply to deliver oxygen and nutrients and to remove waste products such as carbon dioxide. The coronary arteries help fulfill this function.

== Development ==
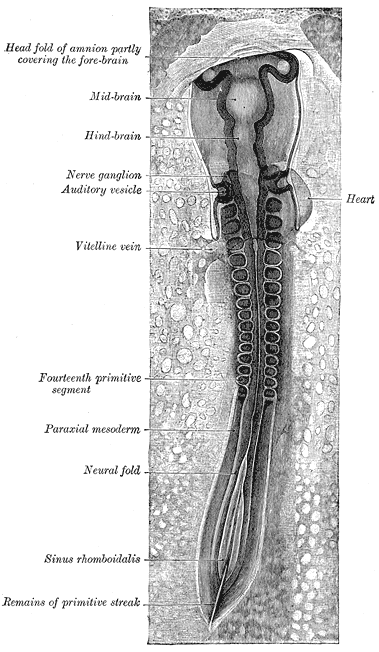
A chicken embryo, showing the paraxial mesoderm on both sides of the neural fold. The anterior (forward) portion has begun to form somites (labeled "primitive segments").

All muscles are derived from paraxial mesoderm. The paraxial mesoderm is divided along the embryo's length into somites, corresponding to the segmentation of the body (most obviously seen in the vertebral column). Each somite has three divisions, sclerotome (which forms vertebrae), dermatome (which forms skin), and myotome (which forms muscle). The myotome is divided into two sections, the epimere and hypomere, which form epaxial and hypaxial muscles, respectively. The only epaxial muscles in humans are the erector spinae and small intervertebral muscles, and are innervated by the dorsal rami of the spinal nerves. All other muscles, including those of the limbs are hypaxial, and innervated by the ventral rami of the spinal nerves.

During development, myoblasts (muscle progenitor cells) either remain in the somite to form muscles associated with the vertebral column or migrate out into the body to form all other muscles. Myoblast migration is preceded by the formation of connective tissue frameworks, usually formed from the somatic lateral plate mesoderm. Myoblasts follow chemical signals to the appropriate locations, where they fuse into elongate skeletal muscle cells.

== Function ==
The primary function of muscle tissue is contraction. The three types of muscle tissue (skeletal, cardiac and smooth) have significant differences. However, all three use the movement of actin against myosin to create contraction.

=== Skeletal muscle ===
In skeletal muscle, contraction is stimulated by electrical impulses transmitted by the motor nerves. Cardiac and smooth muscle contractions are stimulated by internal pacemaker cells which regularly contract, and propagate contractions to other muscle cells they are in contact with. All skeletal muscle and many smooth muscle contractions are facilitated by the neurotransmitter acetylcholine.

=== Smooth muscle ===
Smooth muscle is found in almost all organ systems such as hollow organs including the stomach, and bladder; in tubular structures such as blood and lymph vessels, and bile ducts; in sphincters such as in the uterus, and the eye. In addition, it plays an important role in the ducts of exocrine glands. It fulfills various tasks such as sealing orifices (e.g. pylorus, uterine os) or the transport of the chyme through wavelike contractions of the intestinal tube. Smooth muscle cells contract more slowly than skeletal muscle cells, but they are stronger, more sustained and require less energy. Smooth muscle is also involuntary, unlike skeletal muscle, which requires a stimulus.

=== Cardiac muscle ===
Cardiac muscle is the muscle of the heart. It is self-contracting, autonomically regulated and must continue to contract in a rhythmic fashion for the whole life of the organism. Hence, it has special features.

== Invertebrate muscle ==
There are three types of muscle tissue in invertebrates that are based on their pattern of striation: transversely striated, obliquely striated, and smooth muscle. In arthropods there is no smooth muscle. The transversely striated type is the most similar to the skeletal muscle in vertebrates.
