= SRRT =

SRRT may refer to:

- Serrate RNA effector molecule homolog
- Subaru Road Racing Team
- Social Responsibilities Round Table
- the Russian Special Rapid Response Team or SOBR
