= JLS (disambiguation) =

JLS are a British 4-piece boyband.

JLS may also refer to:

- Jamie Lynn Spears, Britney Spears' sister
- JLS (album), an album by JLS
- .jls, an extension for Lossless JPEG files
- Jane Lathrop Stanford Middle School, a middle school in Palo Alto, California
- Jane Lathrop Stanford
- Jack London Square, a neighborhood in Oakland, California
- Jarcho-Levin Syndrome
- Journal of Libertarian Studies, a scholarly journal published by the Ludwig von Mises Institute and Lew Rockwell
- The Java Language Specification, the specification for the programming language Java.
