= Kim Dale =

British life sciences research scientist

Kim (Jacqueline) Dale
- Born: Cheltenham, England
- Education: University of Southampton
- Occupations: Researcher, professor
- Organization: University of Dundee
- Known for: Establishing the signalling pathways that regulate formation of the vertebrate embryonic body plan and investigating developmental segmentation.
- Website: https://www.lifesci.dundee.ac.uk/people/kim-dale

Kim Dale FRSB, born in Cheltenham, England on 6 January 1971, is a research scientist based in the Cell and Developmental unit of School of Life Sciences at the University of Dundee, as well as being the Associate Dean International for UoD and the University Academic Regional Lead for ASEAN.

In 2005 Dale established her own research group as a Royal Society University Research Fellow in Dundee. Her research is focused on the investigation of the molecular mechanisms regulating the vertebrae embryonic segmentation clock.

== Early life and career ==
Dale attended University of Southampton (UoS) in 1983, where she was awarded Bachelor (BcS) of Science in Molecular Cell Biology with first class honours in 1990.

After leaving UoS she achieved a PhD in Developmental Neurobiology in University College London in 1997.

Dale began her research career in the lab of Marysia Placzek, investigating tissues and signals involved in the induction and patterning of the forebrain ventral neuroectoderm of chick embryos at early stages of development. Following this, Dale obtained a postdoctoral (PhD) position in the lab of Olivier Pourquié, where she began to investigate underlying molecular mechanisms of the segmentation clock, specifically in relation to the Notch signalling pathway.

In August 2002, Dale worked as a senior research specialist in the lab of Olivier Pourquié at the Stowers Institute Kansas City, Missouri in the United States of America, until December 2004. Dale returned to Britain to launch her independent laboratory at the University of Dundee (UoD) in January 2005. She was awarded tenure in 2009 and is now professor of molecular Developmental Biology. In addition to her role as research scientist she is also the Associate Dean (International) in the UoD school of Life sciences and the university academic lead for international activity in ASEAN region, where she holds the position of guest professor at Taylors University, Malaysia. Through the work of Dale and her team UoD has a strong working relationship with the National University of Singapore, Taylors University and the British High Commission in Malaysia. This allows many students to undertake summer research opportunities as well as semester or year long exchanges in partner Universities in Europe and further afield.

== Research ==
Dale's PhD research projects include the Wellcome 4-Year PhD Programme in Integrated Molecular, Cellular and Translational Biology and the MRC DTP 4 Year PhD Programme.

Dale's lab looks at molecular interactions and crosstalk between various signalling pathways that cells use to communicate in order to build tissues and organs during the establishment of the vertebrae axis.

Recent research by Dale and colleagues discovered new insight into the role of Notch in developmental segmentation which has opened avenues to explore the potential association of mis-regulated Notch signalling in the context of cancer. Further details can be found in their primary publication "CDK 1 and CDK 2 regulate NICD 1 turnover and the periodicity of the segmentation clock".

Dale is currently involved in an active project at the Medical Research Council which focuses on Fine-Scale Regulation of Notch Signalling Dynamics, in the Context of the Vertebrate Segmentation Clock. This project began on 14/Aug/2019 and is scheduled to completion on 13/Aug/2022.

== Awards and recognition ==
- Best Postgraduate Supervisor – DUSA Student Led Teaching Awards (2018)
- British Society of Developmental Biology Secretary (2008–2013)
- Fellow of the Society of Biology (2012)
- The Royal Society University Research Fellowship (renewal) (2010)
- The Royal Society University Research Fellowship (2005)
- MRC New Investigator Award (2005)

== Publications ==
- Carrieri, F.A., Murray, P.J., Ditsova, D., Ferris, M.A., Davies, P., Dale, J.K (2019) CDK1 and CDK2 regulate NICD1 turnover and periodicity of the segmentation clock. EMBO Reports. 20, 4, p. 1-22 22 p., e46436 doi/10.15252/embr.201846436
- Murray, P., Carrieri, F.A., Dale, J.K. (2019) Cell cycle regulation of oscillations yields coupling of growth and from in a computational model of the presomitic mesoderm. Journal of Theoretical Biology. doi/10.1016/j.jtbi.2019.05.006
- Mastromina, I., Verrier L, Silva J.C, Storey K.G, and Dale J.K (2018) MYC activity is required for maintenance of the Neuromesodermal Progenitor signalling network and for correct timing of segmentation clock gene oscillations. doi/10.1242/dev.161091
- Meakin, P. J., Jalicy, S. M., Montagut, G., Allsop, D. J. P., Cavellini, D. L., Irvine, S. W., McGinley, C., Liddell, M. K., McNeilly, A. D., Parmionova, K., Liu, Y., Bailey, C. S. L., Dale, J. K., Heisler, L. K., McCrimmon, R. J., Ashford, M. L. J. (2018) Bace1-dependent amyloid processing regulates hypothalamic leptin sensitivity in obese mice. Scientific Reports 8, Article number: 55 doi/10.1038/s41598-017-18388-6
- Bailey, C. S. L., Bone, R. A., Murray, P. J., Dale, J. K (2017) Temporal ordering of dynamic expression data from detailed spatial expression maps. doi/10.3791/55127
- Dale, K., Martí, E (2017) Introduction to the special section: Spinal Cord a model to understand CNS development and regeneration. doi/10.1016/j.ydbio.2017.10.005
- Carrieri FA and Dale JK (2016) Turn It Down a Notch. Front. Cell Dev. Biol. 4:151. doi/10.3389/fcell.2016.00151
- Ellis, P.S., Burbridge, S., Soubes, S., Ohyama, K., Ben-Haim, N., Chen, C., Dale, K., Shen, M.M., Constam, D., and Placzek, M. (2015) Pro Nodal acts via FGFR3 to govern duration of Shh expression in the prechordal mesoderm. Development. 142, 3821–3832. doi/10.1242/dev.119628
