= Palaemonella burnsi =

Conservation status
- Critically Imperiled (NatureServe)

Scientific classification
- Domain: Eukaryota
- Kingdom: Animalia
- Phylum: Arthropoda
- Class: Malacostraca
- Order: Decapoda
- Suborder: Pleocyemata
- Infraorder: Caridea
- Family: Palaemonidae
- Genus: Palaemonella
- Species: P. burnsi

Binomial name
- Palaemonella burnsi Holthuis, 1973

Species of crustacean

Palaemonella burnsi is a species of shrimp in the family Palaemonidae, from Maui, Hawaii. This species is closest to Palaemonella lata, which it resembles in the broad scaphocerite in which the lamella overreaches the final tooth, and in the unarmed merus of the second pereiopods. It differs from P. lata in the much longer fused part of the two branches of the upper antennular flagellum, in the relatively much longer fingers and shorter palm of the second legs, in the unarmed carpus of the second legs. It is named after John A. Burns, Governor of Hawaii, for declaring the Ahiki Kinau area a nature reserve.

== Description ==
Its rostrum is high and straight. It reaches distinctly beyond the antennal peduncle and slightly beyond the scaphocerite. The upper margin possesses eight teeth. The midrib extends over the middle of the rostrum. The carapace shows a sharp antennal spine below the lower orbital angle. The first four abdominal pleura are broadly rounded, the fifth ends in a blunt angle. The sixth somite is 1.5 times longer than the fifth. The telson is elongate and triangular, ending in a narrow rounded posterior margin which bears the usual three pairs of spines. The dorsal surface of the telson bears two pairs of spines, which divide the length of the telson into three parts, the basal of which is slightly the longest, the distal slightly the shortest.

The eyes are well developed, have the cornea wider than the stalk, and an ocellus is fused to the cornea. The lamella is approximately of an equal width in the distal half and does not noticeably narrow near the top.

A strong external spine is present near the base of the scaphocerite. The mandible bears a distinct two-segmented palp. The incisor process ends in three strong teeth. The molar process shows several blunt knobs. The maxillula has both laciniae slender and ending in bristles and spines; the palp is distinctly bifid. All of its maxillipeds have large well developed exopods. The two endites of the first maxilliped are separated by a deep notch.

The first leg reaches with the chela beyond the scaphocerite. The fingers are slender and unarmed, they are approximately as long as the palm. The second legs are equal in shape, sometimes somewhat unequal in size; they reach with the chela or part of the carpus beyond the scaphocerite.

Its palm is slightly swollen. The carpus bears no teeth on the anterior margin. It is slender, and somewhat longer or somewhat shorter than the palm. The fifth leg reaches about half the propodus beyond the scaphocerite.

The eggs are numerous and small, measuring 0.4 millimetres (0.016 in) to 0.7 millimetres (0.028 in) in diameter. The carapace lengths of the animals vary between 6 and 9 millimetres (0.24 and 0.35 in).

Its body is transparent and sprinkled with chromatophores. The carapace shows a short and broad transverse white median band in the middle consisting of irregular bright white chromatophores. A white line or spot is also visible on the eye stalk. The legs are greenish transparent. The chelipeds are greenish with the fingers brownish orange, while the articulations between palm, carpus and merus are brownish. Teeth and spines, including those of the rostrum, carapace, tailfan and scaphocerite, show brownish tips. On the abdomen, distinct red transverse bands are visible. The pleura of the first five abdominal somites also show red chromatophores. The eyestalks are reddish, and some chromatophores are visible on the antennular peduncle. The lower surface of its body is a reddish colour.

== Distribution ==
Palaemonella burnsi has been seen in Cape Kinau and the Kona coast of the island of Hawaii in small anchialine pools. They are not evident during the day.
