= Jean-Paul Thiery =

French biologist

Jean Paul Thiery is a French biologist born on 25 April 1947. He is director of emeritus research at the CNRS-Paris-Diderot University laboratory on complex materials and systems, at the Institut Gustave Roussy's cancer centre and associate professor at several foreign universities.

== Biography ==
Jean Paul Thiery obtained his PhD in biochemistry in 1974 at the Paris Diderot University, Paris. From 1975 to 1977 he carried out postdoctoral research at the Rockefeller University in New York in the laboratory directed by Professor Gerald Edelman, Nobel Prize for Medicine. From 1978 to 1987, he led a team at the Institute of Developmental Biology of the CNRS and the Collège de France. He became director of a CNRS research unit at the École normale supérieure. He joined the Institut Curie in 1995 to head the cell biology laboratory. In 2003 he was appointed Director of the Translational Research Department of the Institut Curie. In 2006, he joined the Singapore Science and Technology Research Agency as Professor and Deputy Director of the Institute of Molecular and Cellular Biology and in 2012 he was appointed Head of the Department of Biochemistry at the Faculty of Medicine of the National University of Singapore. Emeritus CNRS Researcher since 2010, he is currently Associate Professor at the National University of Singapore, the Faculty of Medicine of the University of Hong Kong, the Guangzhou Biomedical Institute of the Chinese Academy of Sciences and the Faculty of Medicine in Bergen, Norway.

He is a corresponding member of the French Academy of sciences (1993), EMBO (1984) and Academia Europaea (1990).

== Scientific work ==
Jean Paul Thiery trained as a chemical engineer (Strasbourg) and then specialised in several disciplines of life sciences during his scientific career.

His initial work focused on the heterogeneity of eukaryotic genome composition. During his postdoctoral stay, he discovered the first intercellular adhesive molecule N-CAM and then described for the first time the relationship between morphogenesis and the adhesive status of cells.

His work on intercellular adhesion led him to establish new techniques for measuring the forces required to detach interacting cells. He demonstrated the crucial role of the cortical actin cytoskeleton in the reinforcement and mechanosensitivity of intercellular adhesion.

He discovered the chemotactic mechanism for colonization of T cell progeny in the thymus. He demonstrated the importance of the mesenchymal-epithelial transition mechanism in the ontogenesis of neural crest cells. This research leads him to hypothesize that malignant epithelial cells use the same strategy to disseminate and metastasize. His pioneering research on the role of mesenchymal-epithelial transition in carcinomas is now the subject of much international research. His current collaborative research with clinicians focuses on the development of therapeutic strategies based on the concept of EMT reversibility to increase the efficacy of target therapies and immunotherapy. He has presented his work in more than 300 international conferences and has published 480 papers (Google Scholar: 55,000 citations - H-index 110). He is co-author of 4 patents and scientific founder of the company Biocheetah, the name of the company having been chosen in accordance with Jean-Paul Thiery's objective to be the first to bring a diagnosis to the market (the cheetah being the fastest animal in the world).

== Awards ==
Professor Jean-Paul Thiery received the Serres Prize of the French Academy of sciences (1983), the Otto Mangold Prize (Berlin) 1987, the Heinz Karger Basel Prize (1990) and the prize of the French National League against Cancer, Paris (1990). He is a laureate of the French Academy of Medicine (2000), Chevalier of the Légion d'Honneur (2009) and Chevalier of the Ordre National du Mérite (1997).
