= Saul Jarcho =

American internist and medical historian

Saul Wallenstein Jarcho, M.D. (October 25, 1906, New York City – September 10, 2000) was an American internist and historian of medicine. He is known for the eponymous Jarcho-Levin syndrome and, to a much lesser extent, Jarcho's syndrome.

== Biography ==
Before entering college, Saul Jarcho studied German, French, and Latin, as well as ancient and modern Hebrew. In 1921, just before his 15th birthday, he matriculated at Harvard College, where he graduated in 1925. He then became a graduate student at Columbia University. There he graduated in 1926 with a master's degree in Latin and also studied advanced Anglo-Saxon and the history of Italian painting. He spent the summer of 1926 at the American Academy in Rome, where he studied ancient monuments and gained enthusiasm for learning Italian. From 1926 to 1930 he attended medical school at the Columbia University College of Physicians and Surgeons.

After receiving his medical degree, Jarcho spent the summer of 1930 at Puerto Rico's School of Tropical Medicine. Later in career he also spent the summers of 1938 and 1941 there. Beginning in autumn 1930 he spent four months as an assistant house surgeon at the New York Lying-In Hospital. From 1931 to 1933 he interned for 30 months as a house physician at Manhattan's Mount Sinai Hospital. For one year from 1933 to 1934 at Mount Sinai Hospital, he served as assistant in pathology under Dr. Paul Klemperer. A minor part of Jarcho's duty was to assist in preparation of specimens for the hospital's outstanding anatomical museum (which was eliminated in 1974). For two years from 1934 to 1936 he was an assistant and instructor in pathology at the pathology department of Johns Hopkins University. There he was supervised by William George MacCallum and Arnold Rice Rich. Returning to Manhattan in 1936, Jarcho entered medical practice and became a part-time instructor in pathology at the Columbia University College of Physicians and Surgeons and also a physician working at Mount Sinai Hospital. In 1940 he was elected a Fellow of the New York Academy of Medicine.

In 1940, Mount Sinai Hospital established a military unit and Jarcho began the study of Arabic. He became an advanced student in colloquial Egyptian Arabic, given in a course at Columbia University and supported but the Intensive Language Program of the American Council of Learned Societies. He began military service in October 1942 as a captain in the U.S. Army and was discharged in June 1946 with the rank of lieutenant colonel. Most of his service was in the Medical Ineglligence Division, of which he became commander in late 1945. About three years later, in October 1948, he married Irma Seijo (1918–2014), who was a research analyst from 1945 to 1948 in Latin American Medical Intelligence for the United States Army's Surgeon General's Office. She was a bacteriologist and science educator.

In 1946 Saul Jarcho returned to medical practice in the Medical Department of Mount Sinai Hospital and teaching at the Mount Sinai School of Medicine. For 2 years, beginning in 1949, he was in charge of cardiovascular research. He retired in 1980. He was the author of more than 200 articles in scholarly journals and more than 60 book reviews. From 1967 to 1977 he served as editor-in-chief of the Bulletin of the New York Academy of Medicine. For more than 20 years he was the USA's most prolific historian of cardiology. From 1958 to 1976 he contributed many historical articles to the American Journal of Cardiology. In 1968 and 1969 he was the president of the American Association for the History of Medicine. He was a leading expert on paleopathology. Jarcho was well aware that for most Americans untranslated works remain unread, so he made a lifelong effort to translate important medical literature ranging from classical antiquity to the recent past. Most of his papers are stored at the National Library of Medicine.

In 1963 he was awarded the William H. Welch Medal from the American Association for the History of Medicine. In 1995 the American Institute of the History of Pharmacy (AIHP) awarded him the George Urdang Medal.

== Death notice published prematurely ==
In January 1998, Saul Jarcho's cousin Israel Saul (I. Saul) Jarcho died at age 90, and the New York Times published a paid death notice on Saturday, January 10, 1998. The alumni director at the Mount Sinai Alumni Associations mistakenly assumed that the death notice was for the 91-year-old Saul Jarcho and called in a death notice with biographical details about Saul Jarcho's career as an internist and medical historian. The New York Times published the erroneous death notice on Tuesday, January 13, 1998, and then a correction on Thursday, January 15, 1998.

== Family ==
Saul Jarcho had a sister Grace Edith (Jarcho) Ross (1913–2010) and a brother Leonard W. Jarcho (1916–1996). The father of the three siblings was Julius Jarcho (1882–1963), a distinguished obstetrician and a generous donor to medical libraries in Israel. Leonard W. Jarcho, a physician and professor of neurology, had three sons, one of whom, John Adams Jarcho, became a physician. John A. Jarcho (1957–2022) was deputy editor for cardiology on the editorial staff of the New England Journal of Medicine. Saul Jarcho and his wife Irma had two sons: Thomas and Andrew. Julia Jarcho, a noted playwright, is the daughter of Thomas Jarcho.

== Selected publications ==
- Jarcho, S.; Andersen, D. H. (1939). "Traumatic autotransplantation of splenic tissue". The American Journal of Pathology. 15 (5): 527–546.3. PMC 1965062. PMID 19970470.
- Jarcho, Saul (1956). "Witnesses to History". Journal of the History of Medicine and Allied Sciences (3): 350. doi:10.1093/jhmas/XI.3.350.
- Jarcho, Saul (1957). "John Mitchell, Benjamin Rush, and Yellow Fever". Bulletin of the History of Medicine. 31 (2): 132–136. JSTOR 44443971. PMID 13426674. (See John Mitchell, Benjamin Rush, and 1793 Philadelphia yellow fever epidemic.)
- Jarcho, Saul (April 1961). "Auenbrugger, Laennec, and John Keats: Some Notes on the Early History of Percussion and Auscultation". Medical History. 5 (2): 167–172. doi:10.1017/S0025727300026132. PMC 1034605. PMID 13789543; Address delivered at the Annual Banquet of the Osler Society of McGill University, 24 February 1960. (See Leopold Auenbrugger, René Laennec, and John Keats.)
- Jarcho, S. (1965). "An early mention of the stethoscope (Locock 1821)". Bulletin of the New York Academy of Medicine. 41 (4): 374–377. PMC 1750714. PMID 14257426. (See Charles Locock.)
- Jarcho, S. (1967). "The psychotic son of Benjamin Rush". Bulletin of the New York Academy of Medicine. 43 (7): 609–610. PMC 1806903. PMID 5343102.
- Jarcho, S. (1968). "Indigestion in colonial Mexico (Farfan, 1592)". Bulletin of the New York Academy of Medicine. 44 (8): 1085–1087. PMC 1750287. PMID 4875750.
- Jarcho, S. (1969). "An Eighteenth Century treatise on dropsy of the chest (Buchner, 1742)". Bulletin of the New York Academy of Medicine. 45 (8): 799–806. PMC 1750442. PMID 4896254.
- Jarcho, S. (1970). "The India office records: A source for historians of psychiatry". Bulletin of the New York Academy of Medicine. 46 (2): 124–127. PMC 1749658. PMID 5262935.
- Jarcho, S. (1970). "Empyema or hydrothorax in the Ninety-Fifth Doge of Venice". Bulletin of the New York Academy of Medicine. 46 (5): 378–385. PMC 1749694. PMID 4912293. (See Francesco Contarini.)
- Jarcho, S. (1970). "Tollund man and other bog burials". Bulletin of the New York Academy of Medicine. 46 (7): 554–557. PMC 1749725. PMID 5270234. (See Tolland Man.)
- Jarcho, S. (1971). "Problems of the autopsy in 1670 A. D." Bulletin of the New York Academy of Medicine. 47 (7): 792–796. PMC 1749905. PMID 4933538.
- Jarcho, S. (1974). "A treatise on squill (Gottwald Schuster, 1757)". Bulletin of the New York Academy of Medicine. 50 (6): 723–746. PMC 1749407.
- Jarcho, S. (1976). "The fate of British traditions in the United States as shown in medical education and in the care of the mentally ill 1750-1850". Bulletin of the New York Academy of Medicine. 52 (3): 419–441. PMC 1808242. PMID 766874.
- Jarcho, S. (1982). "Blankaart's Dictionary, an index to 17th century medicine". Bulletin of the New York Academy of Medicine. 58 (6): 568–577. PMC 1805323. PMID 6756524. (See Steven Blankaart.)
- Jarcho, S. (1990). "Transatlantic transmission of infectious diseases; the applicability of paleopathology". Bulletin of the New York Academy of Medicine. 66 (6): 660–663. PMC 1809789. PMID 2282446.
- Jarcho, S. (1991). "Historical perspectives of medical intelligence". Bulletin of the New York Academy of Medicine. 67 (5): 501–506. PMC 1807979. PMID 1718518.

=== Books ===
- Jarcho, Saul Jarcho, ed. (1966). Proceedings of Symposium on Human Palaeopathology, held in 1965 in Washington, D.C. New Haven: Yale University Press. LCCN 66012503.
- Practical observations on dropsy of the chest (Breslau, 1706). Philadelphia: American Philosophical Society. 1971. LCCN 72143268; translated and edited by Saul Jarcho
- Jarcho, Saul, ed. (1976). Essays on the history of medicine: selected from the Bulletin of the New York Academy of Medicine. New York: Science History Publications. ISBN 0882020668. LCCN 76011770.
- Medicine and health care. New York: Arno Press. 1977. ISBN 0405098502. LCCN 76029724; Saul Jarcho, advisory editor, Gene Brown, editor
- Concept of heart failure from Avicenna to Albertini. Cambridge, Massachusetts: Harvard University Press. 1980. ISBN 0674156358. LCCN 80017613; translations, commentaries and an essay by Saul Jarcho; book details at Harvard University Press
- Morgagni, Giambattista, 1682-1771 (1984). Clinical consultations of Giambattista Morgagni: the edition of Enrico Benassi (1935). Charlottesville, Virginia: published by the University Press of Virginia for the Francis A. Countway Library of Medicine. LCCN 88672025; translated and revised by Saul Jarcho; with a new preface and supplements
- Jarcho, Saul (1986). Italian broadsides concerning public health: documents from Bologna and Brescia in the Mortimer and Anna Neinken Collection, New York Academy of Medicine. Mount Kisco, N.Y.: Futura Publishing Company. ISBN 0879932902. LCCN 86045612.
- Clinical consultations and letters / by Ippolito Francesco Albertini, Francesco Torti, and other physicians. Canton, Massachusetts: published by Science History Publications for the Francis A. Countway Library of Medicine, Boston. 1989. LCCN 89219351; translated and annotated with an introductory analysis by Saul Jarcho; University of Bologna MS 2089-1
- Jarcho, Saul (1992). Tractatus simplex de cortice Peruuiano = A Plain treatise on the Peruvian bark: the Stanitz manuscript. Canton, Massachusetts: published by Science History Publications for the Francis A. Countway Library of Medicine, Boston. ISBN 0881351768. LCCN 93165497.
- Jarcho, Saul (1993). Quinine's predecessor: Francesco Torti and the early history of cinchona. The Henry E. Sigerist Series in the History of Medicine. Baltimore: Johns Hopkins University Press. ISBN 0801844665. LCCN 92049213.
- Jarcho, Saul (2000). Concept of contagion in medicine, literature, and religion. Malabar, Florida: Krieger Publishing. ISBN 1575241595. LCCN 00042398.
- Torti, Francesco, 1658-1741 (2000). Clinical consultations of Francesco Torti. Malabar, Florida: Krieger Publishing Company. ISBN 1575241447. LCCN 99054703; translated and with an introduction by Saul Jarcho
