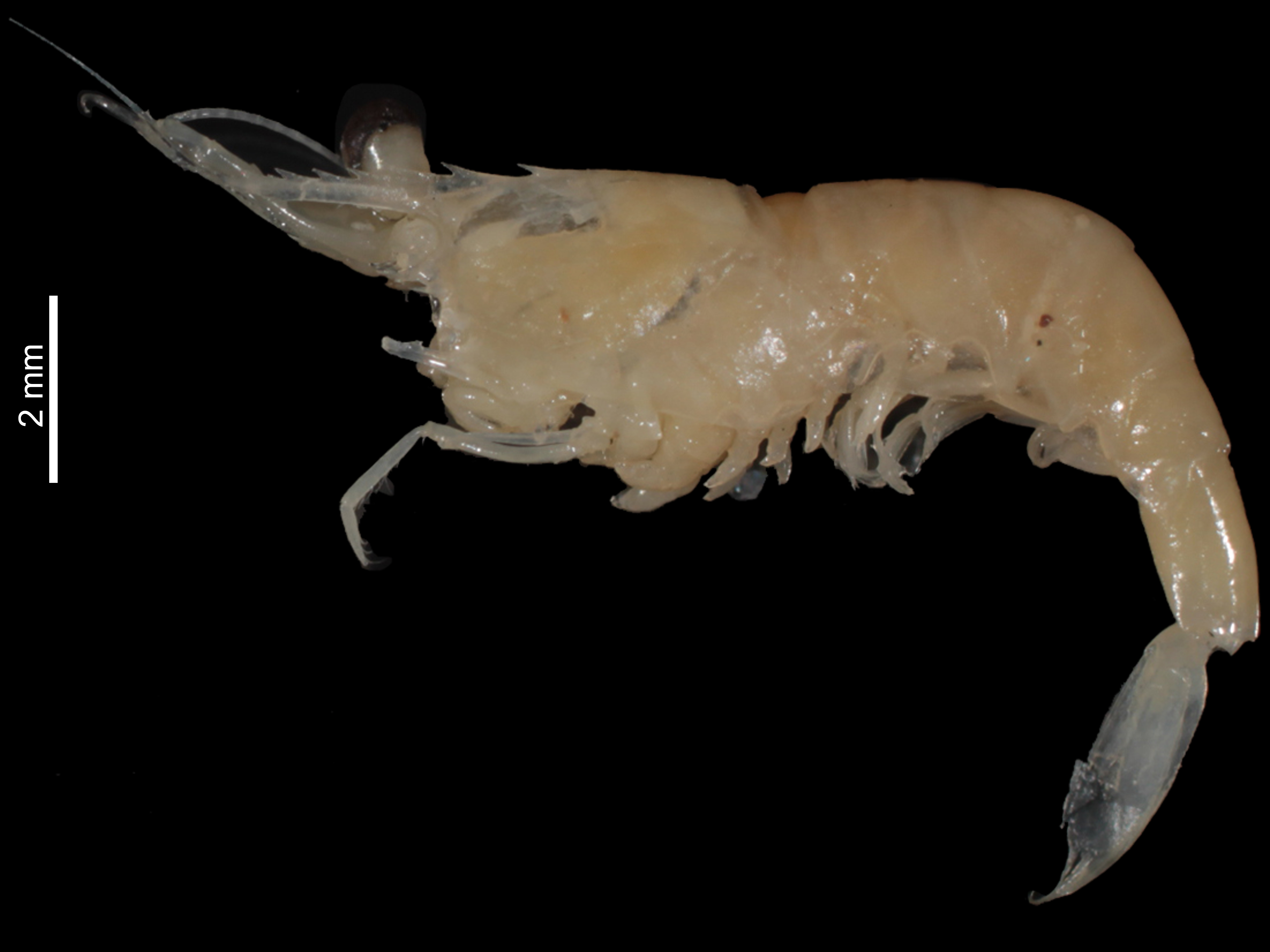
- Palaemonella komaii

Scientific classification
- Domain: Eukaryota
- Kingdom: Animalia
- Phylum: Arthropoda
- Class: Malacostraca
- Order: Decapoda
- Suborder: Pleocyemata
- Infraorder: Caridea
- Family: Palaemonidae
- Genus: Palaemonella; Dana, 1852

= Palaemonella =

Genus of crustaceans

Palaemonella is a genus of shrimp in the family Palaemonidae, containing the following species:

- Palaemonella aliska Marin, 2008
- Palaemonella asymmetrica Holthuis, 1951
- Palaemonella atlantica Holthuis, 1951
- Palaemonella burnsi Holthuis, 1973
- Palaemonella crosnieri Bruce, 1978
- Palaemonella dijonesae Bruce, 2010
- Palaemonella disalvoi Fransen, 1987
- Palaemonella dolichodactylus Bruce, 1991
- Palaemonella foresti Bruce, 2002
- Palaemonella hachijo Okuno, 1999
- Palaemonella holmesi (Nobili, 1907)
- Palaemonella komaii Li & Bruce, 2006
- Palaemonella lata Kemp, 1922
- Palaemonella longidactylus Hayashi, 2009
- Palaemonella maziwi Bruce, 2002
- Palaemonella meteorae Bruce, 2008
- Palaemonella pottsi (Borradaile, 1915)
- Palaemonella pusilla Bruce, 1975
- Palaemonella rotumana (Borradaile, 1898)
- Palaemonella spinulata Yokoya, 1936
- Palaemonella tenuipes Dana, 1852
