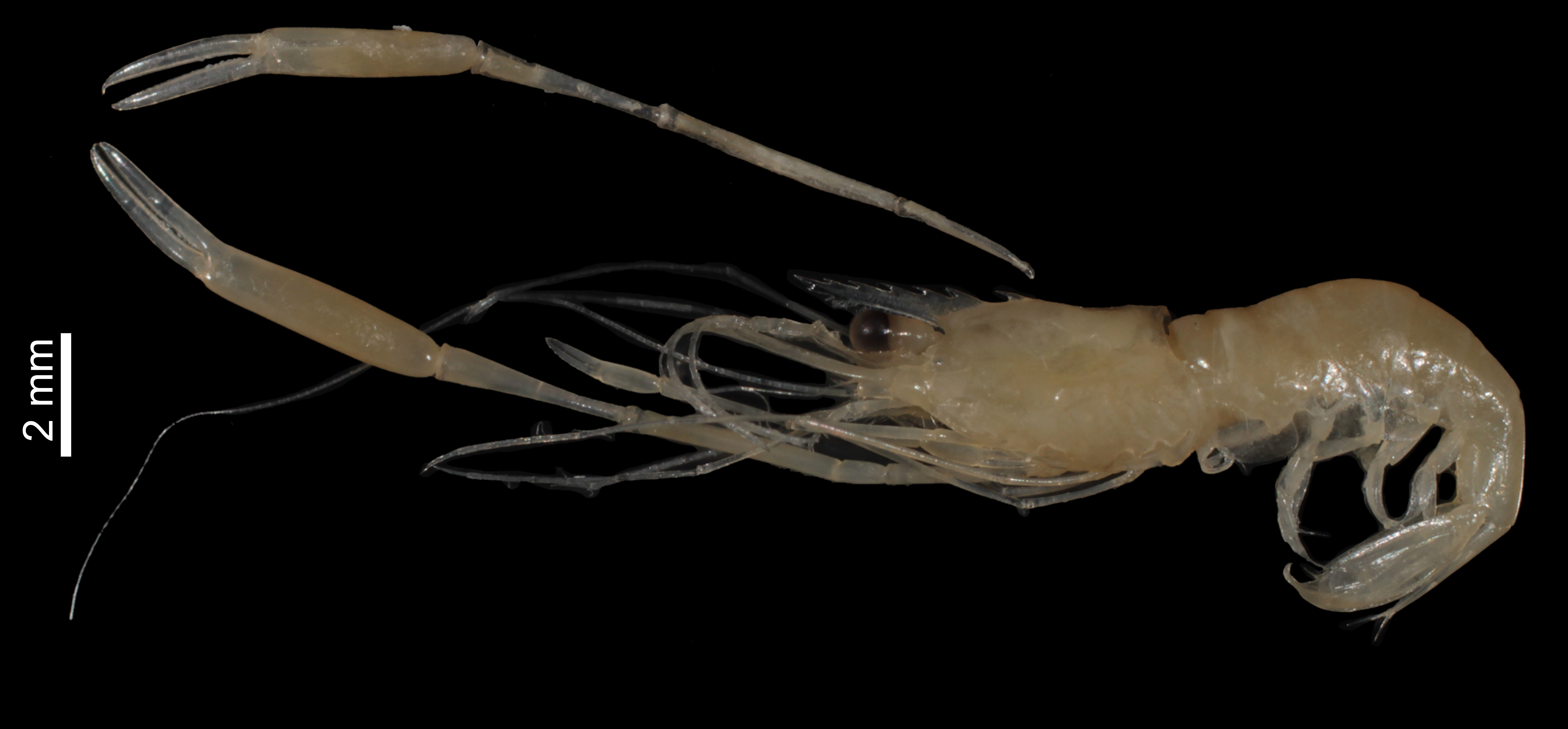

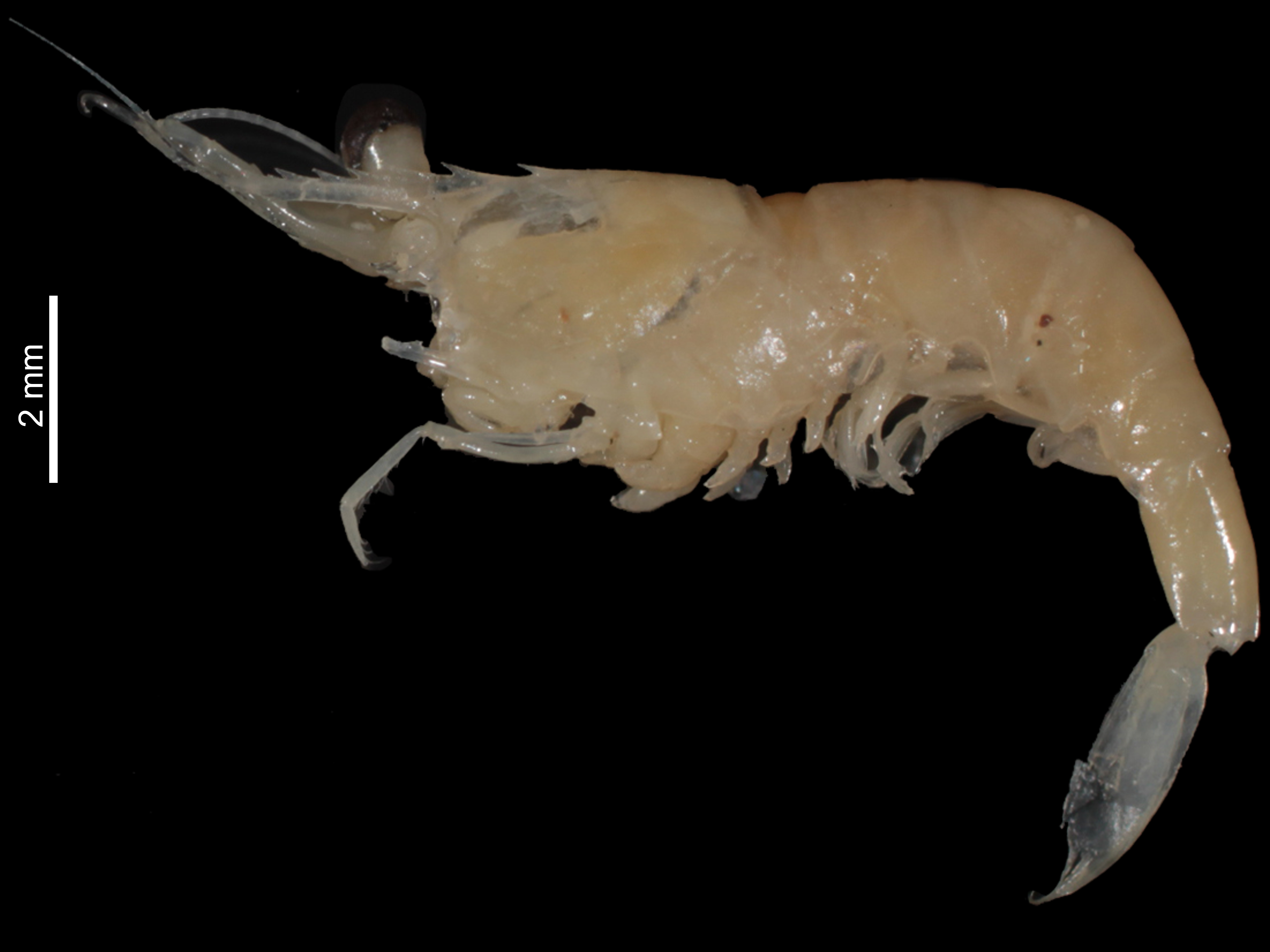

Scientific classification
- Domain: Eukaryota
- Kingdom: Animalia
- Phylum: Arthropoda
- Class: Malacostraca
- Order: Decapoda
- Suborder: Pleocyemata
- Infraorder: Caridea
- Family: Palaemonidae
- Genus: Palaemonella
- Species: P. komaii

Binomial name
- Palaemonella komaii Li & Bruce, 2006

= Palaemonella komaii =

Species of crustacean

Palaemonella komaii is a species of shrimp in the family Palaemonidae, found in the Indo-Pacific. It was first described by Xinzheng Li and Alexander Bruce in 2006, from specimens collected off Tonga and Fiji. The species epithet honours Tomoyuki Komai.
