= Somitogenesis =

Formation of segments in the vertebrate embryo

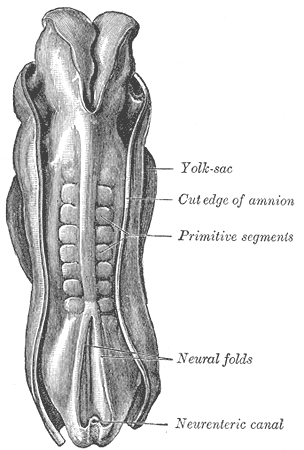
- Dorsum of human embryo, 2.11 mm in length. (The older term primitive segments is used to identify the somites formed in somitogenesis)

Details
- Precursor: Pre-somitic mesoderm
- Gives rise to: dermatome, myotome, syndetome, sclerotome

Somitogenesis is the process by which somites form. Somites are bilaterally paired blocks of paraxial mesoderm that form along the anterior-posterior axis of the developing embryo in vertebrates. The somites give rise to skeletal muscle, cartilage, tendons, endothelium, and dermis.

== Overview ==
During somitogenesis, somites form from the pre-somitic mesoderm, a region of mesoderm at the posterior of the developing embryo. This tissue undergoes convergent extension as the primitive streak regresses, or as the embryo gastrulates. The notochord extends from the base of the head to the tail; with it extend thick bands of paraxial mesoderm.

As the primitive streak continues to regress, somites form from the pre-somitic mesoderm by 'budding off' periodically from the anterior end of the pre-somitic mesoderm. The underlying developmental signals controlling this periodic formation are thought to conform to a clock-wavefront model. These immature somites then are compacted into an outer layer (the epithelium) and an inner mass (the mesenchyme). Somites, and the segmented structures such as vertebrae that arise from them, are each given an identity by the expression of Hox genes within the developing somite.

The cells within each somite are specified based on their location within the somite. In addition, they retain the ability to become any kind of somite-derived structure until relatively late in the process of somitogenesis.

== Mechanism ==
=== Periodicity ===
Once the cells of the pre-somitic mesoderm are in place following cell migration during gastrulation, oscillatory expression of multiple 'clock' genes begins in these cells. A difference in oscillator timing between the anterior and posterior of the pre-somitic mesoderm leads to the creation of travelling waves of gene expression, analogous to a 'mexican wave'.

These largely cell-autonomous oscillations are thought to be driven by autoinhibition of genes in the Hes/Her family, and are thought to synchronise the differentiation of pre-somitic mesoderm cells into somites. These intracellular oscillations are intrinsically noisy and synchrony is achieved by intercellular Notch signalling. The boundary between somites is thought to be patterned by inhibition of ERK signalling by genes in the Hes/Her family, and thus oscillations in gene expression also control the timing, or rate, of somite formation. Once cells have adopted somite fate they undergo an epithelial-mesenchymal transition and form a new somite. The position of the somite boundary is thought to be controlled by a gradient of FGF or Wnt signalling that moves posteriorly at the rate that the embryo elongates and grows, thus coupling somite size to the size of the embryo. Maintenance of undifferentiated cells in the pre-somitic mesoderm by gastrulation or elongation of the pre-somitic mesoderm allows this process to carry on repeatedly, thus explaining the periodic formation of somites.

This mechanism explains why the expression of "clock genes" oscillates with a periodicity equal to the time necessary for one somite to form, for example 30 minutes in zebrafish, 90 minutes in chicks, and 100 minutes in snakes. The identity of clock genes and the mechanism by which they oscillate can vary between different species, for instance zebrafish exhibits a simple negative feedback loop, or chickens and mice exhibit a complicated process in which FGF and Wnt clocks affect the Notch clock. However, the segmentation clock model is highly evolutionarily conserved.

=== Signalling in separation and epithelialization of somites ===
The physical separation of somites depends on the pulling of cells away from each other and the formation of borders and new adhesions between different cells. Studies indicate the importance of pathways involving Eph receptor and the Ephrin family of proteins, which coordinate border formation, in this process. Also, fibronectins and cadherins help the appropriate cells localize with each other.

=== Specification and differentiation ===
Regarding the paraxial mesoderm from which somites form, fate mapping experiments at the blastula stage show pre-somitic mesoderm progenitors at the site of gastrulation, referred to as the primitive streak in some organisms, in regions flanking the organizer. Transplant experiments show that only at the late gastrula stage are these cells committed to the paraxial fate, meaning that fate determination is tightly controlled by local signals and is not predetermined. For instance, exposure of pre-somitic mesoderm to Bone morphogenetic proteins (BMPs) ventralizes the tissue, however in vivo, BMP antagonists secreted by the organizer (such as Noggin and chordin) prevent this and thus promote the formation of dorsal structures.

== Termination of somitogenesis ==
It is currently unknown by what mechanism somitogenesis is terminated. One proposed mechanism is massive cell death in the posterior-most cells of the pre-somitic mesoderm so that this region is prevented from forming somites. Others have suggested that the inhibition of BMP signaling by Noggin, a Wnt target gene, suppresses the epithelial-to-mesenchymal transition necessary for the splitting off of somites from the bands of pre-somitic mesoderm and thus terminates somitogenesis. Although endogenous retinoic acid is required in higher vertebrates to limit the caudal Fgf8 domain needed for somitogenesis in the trunk (but not tail), some studies also point to a possible role of retinoic acid in ending somitogenesis in vertebrates that lack a tail (human) or have a short tail (chick). Other studies suggest termination may be due to an imbalance between the speed of somite formation and growth of the pre-somitic mesoderm extending into this tail region.

== Somitogenesis in different species ==
Different species have different numbers of somites. For example, frogs have approximately 10, humans have 37, chicks have 50, mice have 65, and snakes have more than 300, up to about 500. The differences in the number of somites between species is thought to be largely due to evolutionary changes in the frequency of the segmentation clock, and changes in the duration of somitogenesis.

Somite number is unaffected by changes in the size of the embryo through experimental procedure. Because all developing embryos of a particular species form on average the same number of somites, the number of somites present is typically used as a reference for age in developing vertebrates.
