= Somitomere =

Somitomeres

Details
- Carnegie stage: 11
- Days: Third gestational week
- Precursor: Paraxial mesoderm
- Gives rise to: Somites

Identifiers
- Latin: somitomera
- TE: E5.0.2.2.2.0.2

In the developing vertebrate embryo, the somitomeres (or somatomeres) are collections of cells that are derived from the loose masses of paraxial mesoderm that are found alongside the developing neural tube. In human embryogenesis they appear towards the end of the third gestational week. The approximately 50 pairs of somitomeres in the human embryo, begin developing in the cranial (head) region, continuing in a caudal (tail) direction until the end of week four.

== Development ==
The first seven somitomeres give rise to the striated muscles of the face, jaws, and throat.

The remaining somitomeres, likely driven by periodic expression of the hairy gene, begin expressing adhesion proteins such as N-cadherin and fibronectin, compact, and bud off forming somites. The somites give rise to the vertebral column (sclerotome), associated muscles (myotome), and overlying dermis (dermatome). There are a total of 37 somite pairs at the end of the fifth week of development, after the first occipital somite and 5-7 coccygeal somites disappear from the original 42-44 somites.
