= Serrate RNA effector molecule homolog =

Protein-coding gene in the species Homo sapiens

SRRT
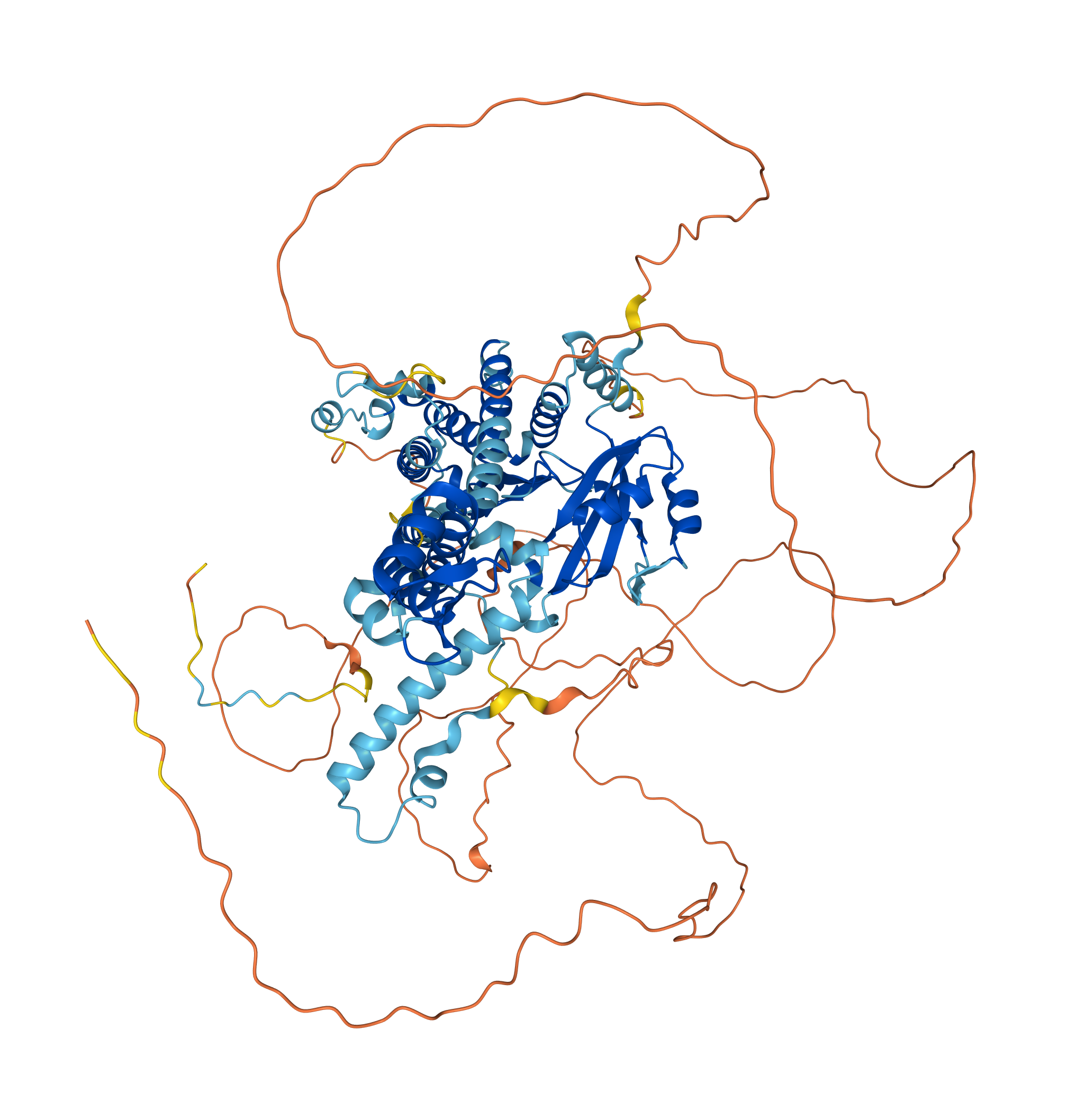

Identifiers
- Aliases: SRRT, ARS2, ASR2, serrate, serrate, RNA effector molecule
- External IDs: OMIM: 614469; MGI: 1933527; HomoloGene: 9298; GeneCards: SRRT; OMA:SRRT - orthologs

Gene location (Human)
Chr.	Chromosome 7 (human)
Band	7q22.1	Start	100,875,103 bp
Band	7q22.1	End	100,888,664 bp

Gene location (Mouse)
Chr.	Chromosome 5 (mouse)
Band	5|5 G2	Start	137,293,966 bp
Band	5|5 G2	End	137,305,936 bp
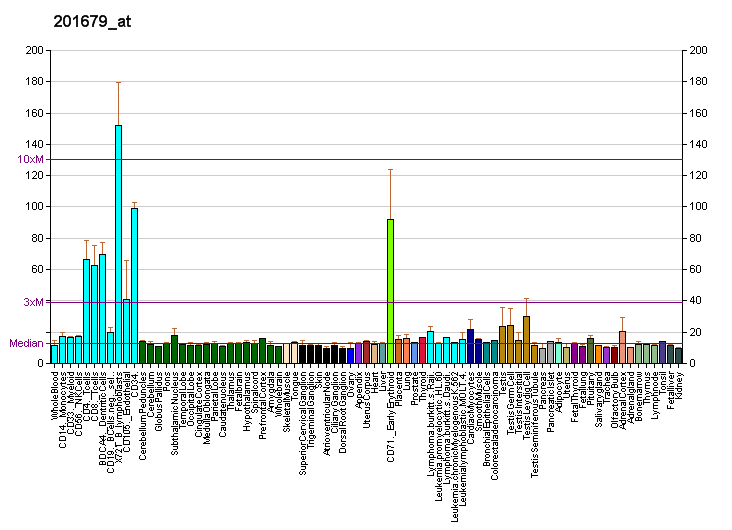

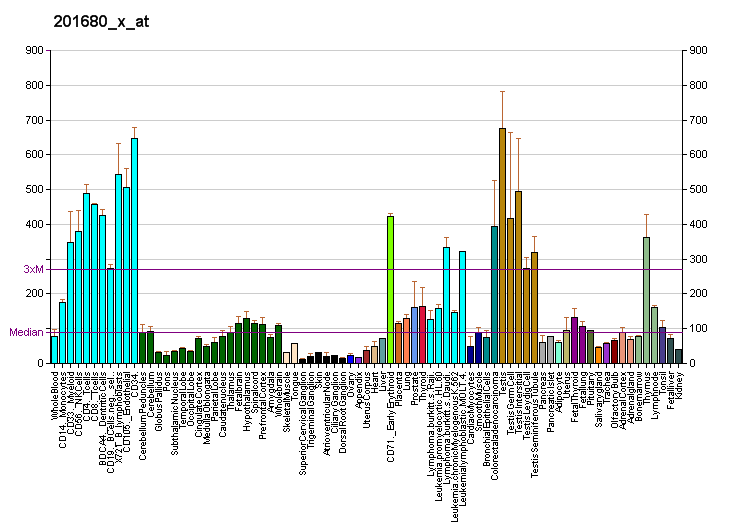

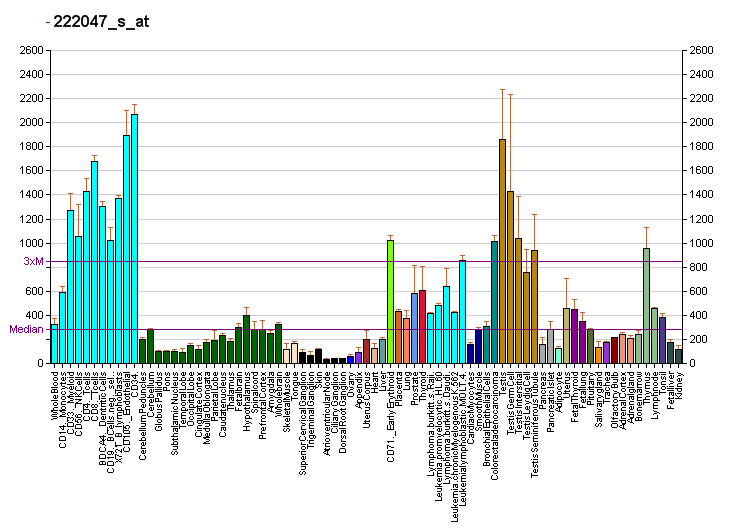
RNA expression pattern
Bgee	Human / Mouse (ortholog); Top expressed in: left testis; right testis; sural nerve; anterior pituitary; right hemisphere of cerebellum; right lobe of thyroid gland; canal of the cervix; left lobe of thyroid gland; right ovary; left ovary / Top expressed in: neural layer of retina; bone marrow; thymus; ventricular zone; striatum of neuraxis; islet of Langerhans; ovary; olfactory bulb; spleen; cerebellum; More reference expression data
BioGPS	More reference expression data
Gene ontology
Molecular function	DNA binding; protein binding; nucleic acid binding; RNA binding
Cellular component	cytoplasm; nucleus; nucleoplasm; protein-containing complex
Biological process	positive regulation of neurogenesis; gene silencing; cell population proliferation; regulation of transcription, DNA-templated; response to arsenic-containing substance; transcription, DNA-templated; neuronal stem cell population maintenance; primary miRNA processing; mRNA splicing, via spliceosome; snRNA transcription by RNA polymerase II; mRNA processing
Sources:Amigo / QuickGO
Orthologs
Species	Human	Mouse
Entrez	51593	83701
Ensembl	ENSG00000087087	ENSMUSG00000037364
UniProt	Q9BXP5	Q99MR6
RefSeq (mRNA)	NM_001128852; NM_001128853; NM_001128854; NM_015908; NM_182800	NM_001109909; NM_001109910; NM_031405; NM_001359602
RefSeq (protein)	NP_001122324; NP_001122325; NP_001122326; NP_056992	NP_001103379; NP_001103380; NP_113582; NP_001346531
Location (UCSC)	Chr 7: 100.88 – 100.89 Mb	Chr 5: 137.29 – 137.31 Mb
PubMed search
- Wikidata
View/Edit Human	View/Edit Mouse

Serrate RNA effector molecule homolog (SRRT) also known as arsenite-resistance protein 2 (ARS2) is a protein that in humans is encoded by the SRRT gene.

The SRRT gene product plays a role in RNA-mediated gene silencing (RNAi) by miRNAs. Independently of its activity on miRNAs, it is necessary and sufficient to promote neural stem cell self-renewal, by directly binding to the SOX2 promoter and positively regulating its transcription. It enables the binding activity of the mRNA cap binding complex and the adaptor activity of certain protein molecules. It can be found in the nucleoplasm and is part of the ribonucleoprotein complex. It is involved in cell cycle progression around the S phase.

It does not directly confer arsenite resistance but rather modulates arsenic sensitivity. Diseases associated with SRRT include spondylocostal dysostosis and cerebral arteriopathy.
