= Mesenchymal–epithelial transition =

Reversible biological process

A mesenchymal–epithelial transition (MET) is a reversible biological process that involves the transition from motile, multipolar or spindle-shaped mesenchymal cells to planar arrays of polarized cells called epithelia. MET is the reverse process of epithelial–mesenchymal transition (EMT) and it has been shown to occur in normal development, induced pluripotent stem cell reprogramming, cancer metastasis and wound healing.

== Introduction ==
Unlike epithelial cells – which are stationary and characterized by an apico-basal polarity with binding by a basal lamina, tight junctions, gap junctions, adherent junctions and expression of cell-cell adhesion markers such as E-cadherin, mesenchymal cells do not make mature cell-cell contacts, can invade through the extracellular matrix, and express markers such as vimentin, fibronectin, N-cadherin, Twist, and Snail. MET plays also a critical role in metabolic switching and epigenetic modifications. In general, epithelium-associated genes are upregulated and mesenchyme-associated genes are downregulated in the process of MET.

== In development ==
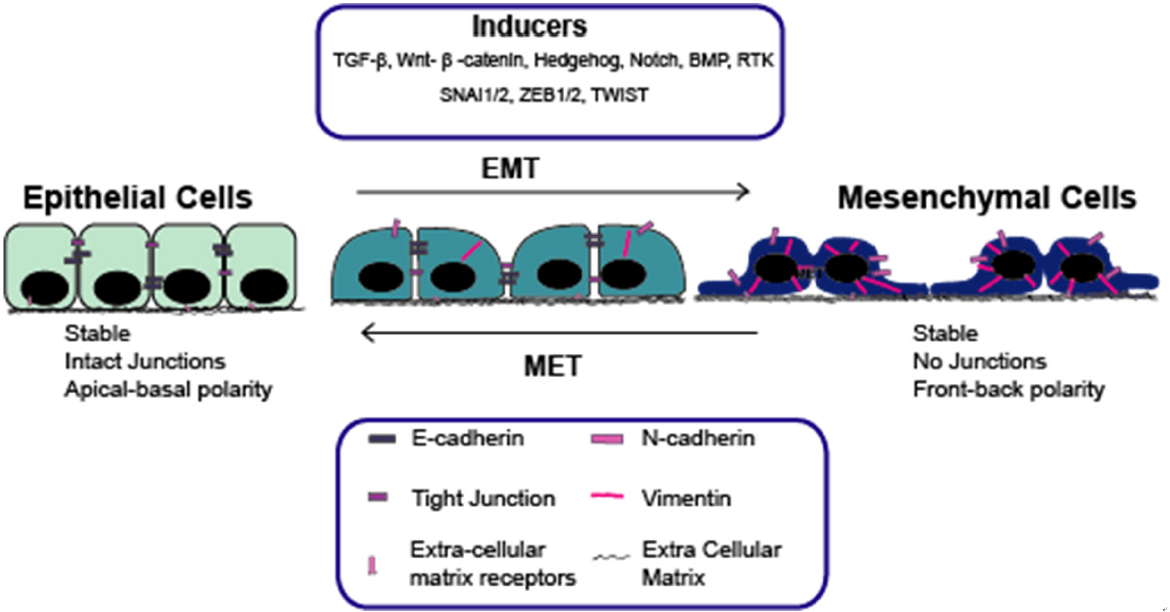
EMT: epithelial-mesenchymal transition; MET: mesenchymal-epithelial transition

During embryogenesis and early development, cells switch back and forth between different cellular phenotypes via MET and its reverse process, epithelial–mesenchymal transition (EMT). Developmental METs have been studied most extensively in embryogenesis during somitogenesis and nephrogenesis and carcinogenesis during metastasis, but it also occurs in cardiogenesis or foregut development. MET is an essential process in embryogenesis to gather mesenchymal-like cells into cohesive structures. Although the mechanism of MET during various organs morphogenesis is quite similar, each process has a unique signaling pathway to induce changes in gene expression profiles.

=== Nephrogenesis ===
One example of this, the most well described of the developmental METs, is kidney ontogenesis. The mammalian kidney is primarily formed by two early structures: the ureteric bud and the nephrogenic mesenchyme, which form the collecting duct and nephrons respectively (see kidney development for more details). During kidney ontogenesis, a reciprocal induction of the ureteric bud epithelium and nephrogenic mesenchyme occurs. As the ureteric bud grows out of the Wolffian duct, the nephrogenic mesenchyme induces the ureteric bud to branch. Concurrently, the ureteric bud induces the nephrogenic mesenchyme to condense around the bud and undergo MET to form the renal epithelium, which ultimately forms the nephron. Growth factors, integrins, cell adhesion molecules, and protooncogenes, such as c-ret, c-ros, and c-met, mediate the reciprocal induction in metanephrons and consequent MET.

=== Somitogenesis ===
Another example of developmental MET occurs during somitogenesis. Vertebrate somites, the precursors of axial bones and trunk skeletal muscles, are formed by the maturation of the presomitic mesoderm (PSM). The PSM, which is composed of mesenchymal cells, undergoes segmentation by delineating somite boundaries (see somitogenesis for more details). Each somite is encapsulated by an epithelium, formerly mesenchymal cells that had undergone MET. Two Rho family GTPases – Cdc42 and Rac1 – as well as the transcription factor Paraxis are required for chick somitic MET.

=== Cardiogenesis ===
Development of heart is involved in several rounds of EMT and MET. While development splanchnopleure undergo EMT and produce endothelial progenitors, these then form the endocardium through MET. Pericardium is formed by sinus venosus mesenchymal cells that undergo MET. Quite similar processes occur also while regeneration in the injured heart. Injured pericardium undergoes EMT and is transformed into adipocytes or myofibroblasts which induce arrhythmia and scars. MET than leads to the formation of vascular and epithelial progenitors that can differentiate into vasculogenic cells which lead to regeneration of heart injury.

== In cancer ==
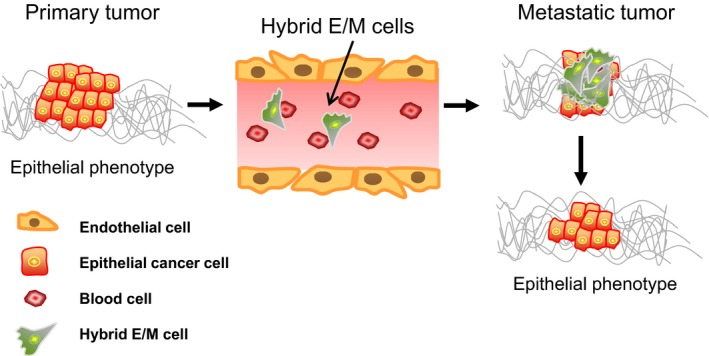
EMT/MET process while metastasis

While relatively little is known about the role MET plays in cancer when compared to the extensive studies of EMT in tumor metastasis, MET is believed to participate in the establishment and stabilization of distant metastases by allowing cancerous cells to regain epithelial properties and integrate into distant organs. Between these two states, cells occur in 'intermediate‐state', or so‐called partial EMT.

In recent years, researchers have begun to investigate MET as one of many potential therapeutic targets in the prevention of metastases. This approach to preventing metastasis is known as differentiation-based therapy or differentiation therapy and it can be used for development of new anti-cancer therapeutic strategies.

== In iPS cell reprogramming ==
A number of different cellular processes must take place in order for somatic cells to undergo reprogramming into induced pluripotent stem cells (iPS cells). iPS cell reprogramming, also known as somatic cell reprogramming, can be achieved by ectopic expression of Oct4, Klf4, Sox2, and c-Myc (OKSM). Upon induction, mouse fibroblasts must undergo MET to successfully begin the initiation phase of reprogramming. Epithelial-associated genes such as E-cadherin/Cdh1, Cldns −3, −4, −7, −11, Occludin (Ocln), Epithelial cell adhesion molecule (Epcam), and Crumbs homolog 3 (Crb3), were all upregulated before Nanog, a key transcription factor in maintaining pluripotency, was turned on. Additionally, mesenchymal-associated genes such as Snail, Slug, Zeb −1, −2, and N-cadherin were downregulated within the first 5 days post-OKSM induction. Addition of exogenous TGF-β1, which blocks MET, decreased iPS reprogramming efficiency significantly. These findings are all consistent with previous observations that embryonic stem cells resemble epithelial cells and express E-cadherin.

Recent studies have suggested that ectopic expression of Klf4 in iPS cell reprogramming may be specifically responsible for inducing E-cadherin expression by binding to promoter regions and the first intron of CDH1 (the gene encoding for E-cadherin).

== See also ==
- Epithelial–mesenchymal transition
