= Spondylocostal dysostosis =

Axial skeleton growth disorder

Jarcho-Levin Syndrome
- Radiograph depicting typical skeletal features of Jarcho-Levin syndrome, subtype spondylothoracic dysplasia. Note fanlike configuration of the ribs, with extensive posterior fusion, along with multiple vertebral segmentation defects.
- Specialty: Medical genetics

Spondylocostal dysostosis, also known as Jarcho-Levin syndrome (JLS), is a rare, heritable axial skeleton growth disorder. It is characterized by widespread and sometimes severe malformations of the vertebral column and ribs, shortened thorax, and moderate to severe scoliosis and kyphosis. Individuals with Jarcho-Levin typically appear to have a short trunk and neck, with arms appearing relatively long in comparison, and a slightly protuberant abdomen. Severely affected individuals may have life-threatening pulmonary complications due to deformities of the thorax. The syndrome was first described by Saul Jarcho and Paul M. Levin at Johns Hopkins University in 1938.

== Genetics ==
Types include:

Type	OMIM	Gene	Locus
SCDO1	277300	DLL3	19q13.2
SCDO2	608681	MESP2	15q26.1
SCDO3	609813	LFNG	7p22.3
SCDO4	613686	HES7	17p13.1
SCDO5	122600	TBX6	16p11.2
SCDO6	616566	RIPPLY2	6q14.2
SCDO7	621523	DMRT2	9p24.3

== Diagnosis ==
=== Subtypes and characteristics ===
In 1968, Dr. David Rimoin and colleagues in Baltimore first distinguished between the two major presentations of Jarcho-Levin. Both conditions were characterized as failures of proper vertebral segmentation. However, the condition within the family described in their article appeared to be inherited in an autosomal dominant fashion and had a less severe course than that reported by other investigators. They specified their condition as spondylocostal dysplasia, which has since become known as spondylocostal dysostosis. The subtype of Jarcho-Levin with which they contrasted their reported cases to is now known as spondylothoracic dysplasia.

=== Spondylothoracic dysplasia ===
Spondylothoracic dysplasia, or STD, has been repeatedly described as an autosomal recessively inherited condition that results in a characteristic fan-like configuration of the ribs with minimal intrinsic rib anomalies. Infants born with this condition typically died early in life due to recurrent respiratory infections and pneumonia due to their restricted thorax. Recently, a report has documented that actual mortality associated with STD is only about 50%, with many survivors leading healthy, independent lives.

=== Spondylocostal dysostosis ===
Characteristic radiograph from child with Jarcho-Levin syndrome, spondylocostal dysostosis subtype

In contrast to STD, the subtype spondylocostal dysostosis, or SCD features intrinsic rib anomalies, in addition to vertebral anomalies. Intrinsic rib anomalies include defects such as bifurcation, broadening and fusion that are not directly related to the vertebral anomalies (such as in STD, where extensive posterior rib fusion occurs due to segmentation defects and extreme shortening of the thoracic vertebral column). In both subtypes, the pulmonary restriction may result in pulmonary hypertension, and have other potential cardiac implications.

== Prognosis ==
Babies born with Jarcho-Levin may be very healthy and grow up to lead normal lives. However, many individuals with Jarcho-Levin suffer from problems of respiratory insufficiency secondary to volume-restricted thoraces. These individuals will often develop pulmonary complications and die in infancy or early childhood. The disparity in outcomes of those with the syndrome is related to the fact that Jarcho-Levin actually encompasses two or more distinct syndromes, each with its own range of prognoses. The syndromes currently recognized as subtypes of Jarcho-Levin are termed spondylothoracic dysplasia and spondylocostal dysostosis. The disease is related to the SRRT gene.

== Epidemiology ==
As of 2017 about 20 cases of Spondylocostal dysostosis have been reported in literature.

Sr. No.	Name of Author/s	Year	Number of cases reported	Brief description
1	Elier JL and Morton JM	1970	1	Diastematomyelia occurred in association Jarcho–Levin syndrome in an infant born to a woman who abused lysergic acid diethylamide during pregnancy
2	Reyes et al.	1989	1	Diastematomyelia (type I split cord malformation) as a component of Jarcho–Levin syndrome
3	Giacoia GP et al.	1991	1	Jarcho–Levin syndrome associated with spina bifida and diastematomyelia (type I split cord malformation)
4	Duru S et al.	1999	2	First case of 2-year-old girl, spondylocostal dysostosis with lipomyelomeningocele, and polythelia on the right side. Second case of 6-month-old girl, spondylocostal dysostosis with myelomeningocele and hydrocephalus
5	Etus et al.	2003	1	Case report of Jarcho–Levin syndrome with diastematomyelia (type I split cord malformation) in a 7-year-old girl
6	Nadkarni, TD et al.	2005	2	2 patients with segmental costovertebral malformation, a form of spondylocostal dysostosis, associated with tethering of the conus to a lipomyelomeningocoele.
7	Vázquez-López, ME et al.	2005	1	Preterm-newborn girl, irregular ribs, Misalignment of vertebral bodies with hemivertebrae at dorsal level.
8	Yi S et al.	2006	1	Spondylocostal dysostosis with intrathoracic myelomeningocele
9	Rosa RFM et al.	2009	3	Patient 1: white girl, 22 months old, born with a lumbar meningomyelocele. Patient 2: white girl, 22 months old, spina bifida occulta at L5/S1. Patient 3: white girl, nine days old, with thoracolumbar meningocele.
10	Sparrow DB et al.	2008	1	Caucasian Mediterranean child with hydrocephalus and myelomeningocele, shortened thorax, ectopic and stenotic anus, and talipes associated with SCDO-4
11	Çetinkaya M et al.	2008	1	Male child born at 40 weeks of gestation with lumbosacral myelomeningocele.
12	Kansal R et al.	2011	1	One and half year old male child of Jarcho–Levin syndrome with spina bifida and diastematomyelia (type I split cord malformation)
13	Dizostozis ES et al.	2013	1	2-year-old female, with double nipples on the right side and type I split cord malformation and tethered cord
14	Anjankar SD et al.	2014	1	8-month-old male child with lipomyelomeningocele with rib cage defect on left side
15	Rafid Alaskary	2017	2	5 days old neonate with hydrocephalus and spina bifida with absence of 7 ribs in the left side of the chest wall with vertebral deformity and scoliosis. Second case 20 days old female with myelomeningocele, hydrocephalus, absence ribs, vertebral deformity.

== Terminology ==
"Type 1" is also known as "Jarcho-Levin syndrome", or "JLS".

While clinicians almost unanimously refer to the syndrome as "Jarcho-Levin", reports have variously labelled or referred to the condition as all of the following: Hereditary malformations of the vertebral bodies, hereditary multiple hemivertebrae, syndrome of bizarre vertebral anomalies, spondylocostal dysplasia, spondylothoracic dysplasia, costovertebral anomalies, costovertebral dysplasia, spondylothoracic dysplasia, occipito-facial-cervico-thoracic-abdomino-digital dysplasia (deemed "ridiculously long" and "unwarranted" by OMIM), and spondylocostal dysostosis.

A closely related condition termed "Costovertebral segmentation defect with mesomelia and peculiar facies", or Covesdem syndrome, was first described in 1978 in India.
