= LFNG =

Protein-coding gene in the species Homo sapiens

Identifiers
- Aliases: LFNG, SCDO3, LFNG O-fucosylpeptide 3-beta-N-acetylglucosaminyltransferase
- External IDs: OMIM: 602576; MGI: 1095413; GeneCards: LFNG
Enzyme activity
EC #	BRENDA	ExPASy	KEGG	MetaCyc
2.4.1.222	↗	↗	↗	↗

Gene location (Human)
Chr.	Chromosome 7 (human)
Band	7p22.3	Start	2,512,529 bp
Band	7p22.3	End	2,529,177 bp

Gene location (Mouse)
Chr.	Chromosome 5 (mouse)
Band	5 G2|5 79.15 cM	Start	140,593,075 bp
Band	5 G2|5 79.15 cM	End	140,601,300 bp
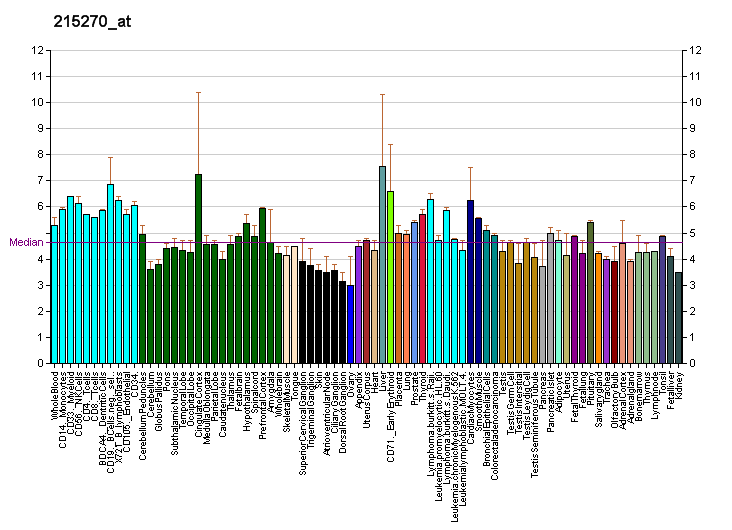
RNA expression pattern
Bgee	Human / Mouse (ortholog); Top expressed in: granulocyte; body of pancreas; monocyte; mucosa of transverse colon; skin of abdomen; skin of leg; ventricular zone; body of stomach; minor salivary glands; nucleus accumbens / Top expressed in: tail of embryo; ventricular zone; lumbar subsegment of spinal cord; lip; granulocyte; mesenteric lymph nodes; gastrula; lens; spleen; blood; More reference expression data
BioGPS	More reference expression data
Gene ontology
Molecular function	transferase activity; glycosyltransferase activity; metal ion binding; O-fucosylpeptide 3-beta-N-acetylglucosaminyltransferase activity; molecular function; acetylglucosaminyltransferase activity
Cellular component	extracellular vesicle; integral component of membrane; integral component of Golgi membrane; Golgi apparatus; membrane; Golgi membrane; extracellular region
Biological process	somitogenesis; pattern specification process; regulation of somitogenesis; marginal zone B cell differentiation; negative regulation of Notch signaling pathway involved in somitogenesis; multicellular organism development; T cell differentiation; compartment pattern specification; animal organ morphogenesis; ovarian follicle development; positive regulation of protein binding; regulation of Notch signaling pathway; positive regulation of Notch signaling pathway; positive regulation of meiotic cell cycle; protein O-linked fucosylation
Sources:Amigo / QuickGO
Orthologs
Databases	NCBI: entry; OMA: entry
Species	Human	Mouse
Entrez	3955	16848
Ensembl	ENSG00000106003	ENSMUSG00000029570
UniProt	Q8NES3	O09010
RefSeq (mRNA)	NM_002304; NM_001040167; NM_001040168; NM_001166355	NM_008494
RefSeq (protein)	NP_001035257; NP_001035258; NP_001159827; NP_002295	NP_032520
Location (UCSC)	Chr 7: 2.51 – 2.53 Mb	Chr 5: 140.59 – 140.6 Mb
PubMed search
- Wikidata
View/Edit Human	View/Edit Mouse

Beta-1,3-N-acetylglucosaminyltransferase lunatic fringe, also abbreviated as Lunatic Fringe or LFNG, is a protein encoded in humans by the LFNG gene.

This gene encodes a member of the glycosyltransferase superfamily. The encoded protein is a single-pass type II Golgi membrane protein that functions as a fucose-specific glycosyltransferase, adding an N-acetylglucosamine to the fucose residue of a group of signaling receptors involved in regulating cell fate decisions during development. Mutations in this gene have been associated with autosomal recessive spondylocostal dysostosis 3. Alternatively spliced transcript variants that encode different isoforms have been described; however, not all variants have been fully characterized.

== Function ==
LFNG is a gene whose role in embryonic development is to establish the anterior boundary of somites, which will eventually develop in vertebrae, ribs, and dermis. Lunatic Fringe responds to certain threshold ratios of retinoic acid and FGF-8 in order to mark the anterior boundary of somites while another transcription factor, Hairy, responds to different threshold ratios of retinoic acid and FGF-8 to form the posterior boundaries of somites.

== Clinical significance ==
A defect associated with Lfng mutations is spondylocostal dysostosis. Spondylocostal dysostosis is characterized by segmentation problems in the developing vertebrae resulting in fusion or lack of vertebrae along with abnormalities in the ribs. Clinically, spondylocostal dysostosis presents as a shortened neck and trunk relative total height and a mild form of scoliosis. Respiratory problems are also common in spondylocostal dysostosis because of the shortened trunk.

A knockout model for Lfng has been created in mice, and without Lfng, mice have shorter tails, and impaired rib, lung, and somite development. A deficiency of Lfng in male mice has also been associated with lack of spermatozoa in the epididymis of many mice; however, spermatogenesis was not impaired. Rather, the male mice were subfertile. In female mice, Lfng deficiency led to infertility because of abnormal folliculogenesis. Further examination showed that oocytes from these female mice did not complete meiotic maturation. However, there are other studies that contradict this stating that not all female mice deficient of Lfng are infertile. A possible explanation for this difference between these studies is that the Lfng alleles were functional different, however, this is unlikely. More likely is that this discrepancy results from differences in the genetic background of the mice or husbandry and colony conditions.

== Impact of mutation ==
Lunatic Fringe is a transcription factor that plays a crucial role in the development of the somites. Somites give rise to the skeletal muscle, the axial skeleton, the tendons, and the dorsal dermis. The somites are formed via the clock-wave front model, and as each somite is formed, each cell receives a burst of FGF8 (a signaling molecule). Somites are formed anterior to posterior, and since FGF8 has a short half-life, this leads to a greater concentration of FGF8 in the posterior, and a lesser concentration in the anterior. Lunatic fringe responds to the lower concentration of FGF8 in the anterior and leads these cells to their developmental fate. Mutation of the Lunatic Fringe gene can cause severe spondylocostal dysostosis, which involves vertebral segmentation defects and rib abnormalities. A mutation was discovered in which a conservative phenylalanine close to the active site of the enzyme mutates, leading to the enzymatic inactivation of Lunatic Fringe. A “knock-out” model has been created using mice. In mice, Lunatic Fringe plays a crucial role in the Notch signaling pathway during the formation of somites, and a mutation in this gene leads to somites with irregular shapes and a defect in the anterior-posterior formation.
