= Developmental signaling center =

Type of group of cells

A developmental signaling center is defined as a group of cells that release various morphogens which can determine the fates, or destined cell types, of adjacent cells. This process in turn determines what tissues the adjacent cells will form. Throughout the years, various development signaling centers have been discovered.

== Spemann-Mangold organizer ==
In 1924, Hans Spemann and Hilde Mangold discovered a region in the dorsal blastopore lip of an amphibian embryo that induced certain neighboring cells into becoming neural tissue. This Spemann-Mangold organizer was the first time that a developmental organizer region was identified and studied. Since then analogous embryonic organizers have been found in other organisms. The Spemann-Mangold organizer is important to developmental biology because it was the first proof that particular cell populations influenced the differentiation of other cells through signaling molecules.

== Nieuwkoop center ==
The Nieuwkoop center, named after the developmental biologist Pieter Nieuwkoop, is a cluster of dorsal vegetal cells in a blastula which produce both mesoderm-inducing and dorsalizing signals. Signals from the Nieuwkoop center induce the Spemann-Mangold organizer, thus the Nieuwkoop Center is known as the organizer of the organizer. Even with the BCNE center (Blastula chordin and noggin expression center) removed from the blastula, the Nieuwkoop Center is able to induce formation of the Spemann-Mangold organizer. Transplant of the Nieuwkoop Center causes formation of an embryonic axis with an endodermal fate which contains dorsal mesoderm.

Due to difficulty defining definitive Nieuwkoop regions, little is known about the molecular composition of the Nieuwkoop signal. However, cells from the Nieuwkoop Center express potent mesoderm inducers as well as the secreted protein, Cerberus (CER1), which contributes to the formation of the head, heart, and asymmetry of internal organs. Furthermore, a homeobox gene, nieuwkoid, was named after the Nieuwkoop Center for its role in development. Nieuwkoid is expressed immediately following the mid-blastula transition to a pregastrula embryo on the dorsal side and mis-expression of nieuwkoid was found to be sufficient for induction of secondary axes.

== BCNE center ==
The BCNE center is the Blastula Chordin and Noggin Expressing center. The BCNE center is located in the dorsal region of the animal pole. It appears after the mid-blastula stage and is triggered by the expression of beta-catenin like the Nieuwkoop center. This center is found to be distinct from the Nieuwkoop center, which secretes a different group of factors, due to expression of VegT and B1-Sox which prevents the BCNE center from extending into the vegetal pole of the blastula. The BCNE center is found to secrete several factors: chordin, noggin, Xnr3, siamois, goosecoid, twin, Admp, and FoxA4a. This center predisposes cells in the blastula stage to become neural tissue. The cells of the BCNE region give rise to the forebrain, most of the mid-brain and hind-brain, the notochord, and the floor plate.
