= Fish development =

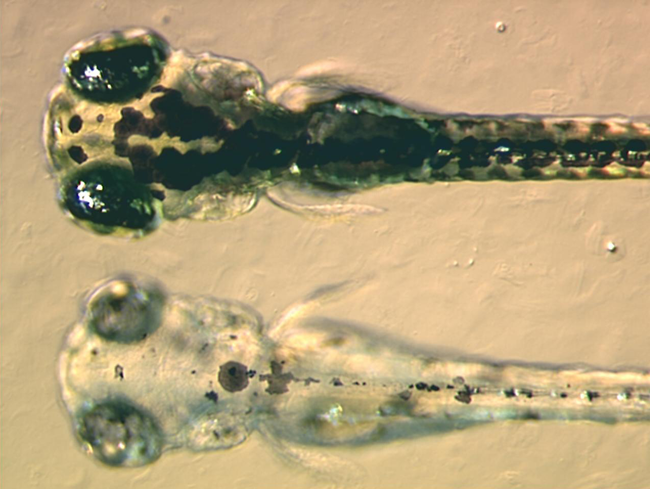
Zebrafish embryos (Danio rerio).

The development of fishes is unique in some specific aspects compared to the development of other animals.

== Cleavage ==
Most bony fish eggs are referred to as telolecithal which means that most of the egg cell cytoplasm is yolk. The yolky end of the egg (the vegetal pole) remains homogenous while the other end (the animal pole) undergoes cell division. Cleavage, or initial cell division, can only occur in a region called the blastodisc, a yolk free region located at the animal pole of the egg. The fish zygote is meroblastic, meaning the early cell divisions are not complete. This type of meroblastic cleavage is called discoidal because only the blastodisc becomes the embryo. In fish, waves of calcium released direct the process of cell division by coordinating the mitotic apparatus with the actin cytoskeleton, propagating cell division along the surface, assists in deepening the cleavage furrow, and finally heals the membrane after separation of blastomeres.

The fate of the first cells, called blastomeres, is determined by its location. This contrasts with the situation in some other animals, such as mammals, in which each blastomere can develop into any part of the organism. Fish embryos go through a process called mid-blastula transition which is observed around the tenth cell division in some fish species. Once zygotic gene transcription starts, slow cell division begins and cell movements are observable. During this time three cell populations become distinguished. The first population is the yolk syncytial layer. This layer forms when the cells at the vegetal pole of the blastoderm combine with the yolk cell underneath it. Later in development the yolk syncytial layer will be important in directing cell movements of gastrulation. The second cell population is the enveloping layer which is made of superficial cells from the blastoderm that eventually form a single epithelial cell layer. This layer functions in protection by allowing the embryo to develop in a hypotonic solution so the cell will not burst. Finally, the third set of blastomeres are the deep cells. These deep cells are located between the enveloping layer and the yolk syncytial layer and eventually give rise to the embryo proper.

== Germ layer formation ==
Once blastoderm cells have covered almost half of the yolk cell, thickening throughout the margin of deep cells occurs. The thickening is referred to as the germ ring and is made up of a superficial layer, the epiblast which will become ectoderm, and an inner layer called the hypoblast which will become endoderm and mesoderm. As the blastoderm cells undergo epiboly around the yolk the internalization of cells at the blastoderm margin start to form hypoblast. Presumptive ectoderm or epiblast cells do not internalize but the deep cells (inner layer of cells) do and they become the mesoderm and endoderm. As the hypoblast cells move inward future mesoderm (hypoblast cells) start to move vegetally and proliferate but later in development these cells alter their direction and start moving towards the animal pole. However, endodermal precursors seem to lack a pattern and move randomly over the yolk.

== Axis formation ==
Once the egg has become multicellular and positioned its germ layers with ectoderm on the outside, mesoderm in the middle, and endoderm on the inside body axes have to be determined for proper development. A dorsal-ventral axis has to form and major proteins involved are BMP and Wnts. Both proteins are made in the ventral and lateral portions of the developing embryo. BMP2B induces cells to have ventral and lateral fates while factors such as chordin can block BMPs to dorsalize the tissue. Wnt8 induces ventral, lateral, and posterior regions of embryonic tissue. Wnt also has inhibitors like noggin to allow for the formation of dorsal tissue. In order to aid in proper development fish have an organizer center called the Nieuwkoop center. Anterior and posterior axis formation seems to be the result of interplay of FGFs, Wnt, and retinoic acid. FGFs, retinoic acid, and Wnts are required to turn on posterior genes.

== Neurulation ==
Neurulation, the formation of the central nervous system, is different in fishes than in most other chordates. Convergence and extension in the epiblast recruits presumptive neural cells from the epiblast towards the midline where they form a neural keel. A neural keel is a band of neural precursors that develops a slit like lumen to eventually become the neural tube. The neural tube begins as a solid cord formed from the ectoderm. This cord then sinks into the embryo and becomes hollow, forming the neural tube. This process contrasts with the process in other chordates, which occurs by an infolding of the ectoderm to form a hollow tube.

Throughout the years advances in research have shown that neural formation relies on interactions between extrinsic signaling factors and intrinsic transcription factors. Extrinsic signals involved are BMP, Wnt, and FGF and intrinsic transcription factors like SoxB1 related genes. Secreted proteins such as BMP and its antagonist Noggin and chordin act permissively to establish the fate of neural tissue in the dorsal ectoderm and enables the formation of the neural plate.

== Sex determination ==
Sex determination is variable in fish from environmental factors like temperature to genetic mechanisms. Some fish have XX/XY chromosomes and others have ZZ/ZW. So far one gene in specific, DMRT1bY, has been described as a sex determining gene. This gene is expressed before gonads develop and differentiate. Mutations in this gene lead to sex reversal from male to female. While this gene plays a major role in sex determination in some fish species other species have variations of this gene as well as some versions of the Sox gene as seen in zebrafish. Many species of fishes are hermaphrodites. Some, such as the painted comber (Serranus scriba), are synchronous hermaphrodites. These fish have both ovaries and testes and can produce both eggs and sperm at the same time. Others are sequential hermaphrodites. These fishes start life as one sex and undergo a genetically programmed sex change at some point during development. Their gonads have both ovarian and testicular tissues, with one type of tissue predominant while the fish belongs to the corresponding gender.
