= Organizing center =

Organizing center may refer to:

- Microtubule organizing center
- Spemann's Organizer
- Certain groups of cells in mesoderm formation, see FGF and mesoderm formation
- Primitive streak in Amniotes responsible for gastrulation
- a small cell group underneath the stem cells in Arabidopsis and other plants
- animal cap cells treated with activin
