= Primitive node =

Organisational structure in early vertebrate embryogenesis

Details
- Days: 17

Identifiers
- Latin: nodus primitivus

The primitive node (or primitive knot) is the embryonic organizer, a specialized signaling centre for gastrulation in most amniotes. In mammals the primitive node is a well-defined structure with established functions. It is the origin of the prechordal plate, and notochord, and has an important role in specifying left-right asymmetry.

In birds, it is known as Hensen's node, and in amphibians, it is known as the Spemann-Mangold organizer. It is induced by the Nieuwkoop center in amphibians, or by the posterior marginal zone of Koller's sickle in birds.

This blastoporal axial organizer is conserved not only among tetrapods, but more broadly among Cnidaria, Ctenophora, and Bilateria – all major groups of animals except sponges. The classic demonstration of the region is due to Spemann (1924), in which transplanting the dorsal blastopore lip from one frog embryo to another causes the formation of an ectopic body axis.

== Diversity ==
- In birds, the organizer is known as Hensen's node, named after its discoverer Victor Hensen.
- In other amniotes, it is known as the primitive node.
- In amphibians, it is known as the Spemann-Mangold organizer, named after Hans Spemann and Hilde Mangold, who first identified the organizer in 1924.
- In fish, it is known as the embryonic shield.

All structures are as yet considered as homologous. This view is substantiated by the common expression of several genes, including goosecoid, Cnot, noggin, nodal, and the sharing of strong axis-inducing properties upon transplantation. Cell fate studies have revealed that also the overall temporal sequence in which groups of endomesodermal cells internalize along the frog blastopore and amniote primitive streak are surprisingly similar: the first cells that involute around the amphibian blastopore lip in the organizer region, and that immigrate through Hensen's node, contribute to foregut endoderm and prechordal plate. Cells involuting further laterally in the blastopore, or entering via Hensen's node and the anterior primitive streak, contribute to gut, notochord and somites. Gastrulation then continues along the ventroposterior blastopore lip and posterior streak region, from where cells contribute to ventral and posterior mesoderm. Adding to this, Brachyury and caudal homologues are expressed circumferentially around the blastopore lips in the frog, and along the primitive streak in chick and mouse. This would suggest that, despite their different morphology, the amniote primitive streak and the amphibian blastopore are homologous structures, that have evolved from one and the same precursor structure by a continuous sequence of morphological modifications.

== Development ==
In chick development, the primitive node starts as a regional knot of cells that forms on the blastodisc immediately anterior to where the outer layer of cells will begin to migrate inwards - an area known as the primitive streak, which is involved with Koller's sickle. When the primitive streak is approaching its full length (almost 2 mm), the tip, now designated Hensen's node, forms a novel compact assembly of cells. From here cells continue to emigrate and become replaced from the surrounding epiblast. The center of Hensen's node contains a funnel-shaped depression, the primitive pit, where the cells of the epiblast (the upper layer of embryonic cells) initially begin to invaginate. This invagination expands posteriorly into the primitive groove as the cell layers continue to move into the space between the embryonic cells and the yolk. This differentiates the embryo into the three germ layers - endoderm, mesoderm, and ectoderm. The primitive node migrates posteriorly as gastrulation proceeds, eventually being absorbed into the tail bud.

This leads to a dynamic nature of the node and a non-homogeneous cellular composition as can be seen from the fate of emigrating cells and from gene expression patterns. The node cells do not express the composition of organizer-inducing factors present in the posterior marginal zone and in the young streak. The node, therefore, represents a new functional quality. The presence of an antidorsalizing activity in the node, the TGF-like factor ADMP, antagonizes further, anterior and lateral, node inductions, thus guaranteeing its unique nature.

== Default model ==
The cells of the primitive node secrete many cellular signals essential for neural differentiation. After gastrulation the developing embryo is divided into ectoderm, mesoderm, and endoderm. The ectoderm gives rise to epithelial and neural tissue, with neural tissue being the default cell fate. Bone morphogenetic proteins (BMPs) suppress neural differentiation and promote epithelial growth. Therefore, the primitive node (the dorsal lip of the blastopore) secretes BMP antagonists, including noggin, chordin, and follistatin. The node gives rise to the prechordal mesoderm, notochord and medial part of the somites.

The first cells to migrate through Hensen's node are those destined to become the pharyngeal endoderm of the foregut. Once deep within the embryo, these endodermal cells migrate anteriorly and eventually displace the hypoblast cells, causing the hypoblast cells to be confined to a region in the anterior portion of the area pellucida. This anterior region, the germinal crescent, does not form any embryonic structures, but it does contain the precursors of the germ cells, which later migrate through the blood vessels to the gonads.

The next cells entering through Hensen's node also move anteriorly, but they do not travel as far ventrally as the presumptive foregut endodermal cells. Rather, they remain between the endoderm and the epiblast to form the prechordal plate mesoderm. Thus, the head of the avian embryo forms anterior (rostral) to Hensen's node. The next cells passing through Hensen's node become the chordamesoderm. The chordamesoderm has two components: the head process and the notochord. The most anterior part, the head process, is formed by central mesoderm cells migrating anteriorly, behind the prechordal plate mesoderm and toward the rostral tip of the embryo. The head process will underlie those cells that will form the forebrain and midbrain. As the primitive streak regresses, the cells deposited by the regressing Hensen's node will become the notochord in a process called neurulation.

== Molecular signals ==
Regional differences in gene expression patterns are observed in the Hensen's node region at the six-somite stage. Shh is strongly expressed in the rostral half of Hensen's node both dorsally and ventrally, future floor plate and notochord cells. In the caudal node, Shh transcripts become progressively less abundant and are located essentially in the most ventral cells, except for endodermal cells.

In contrast, HNF-3b is expressed in the entire mass of cells situated within the median pit and extending about 70 mm posteriorly. Both Shh and HNF-3b transcripts are found in the notochord and the floor plate rostral to the node, and they are completely absent in the lateral and caudal neural plate and the primitive streak. In the node proper, the chordin expression pattern is very similar to that of HNF-3b, but more rostrally, chordin is no longer expressed in the floor plate is predominantly expressed in the ventral part of the node.

Comparison of the expression patterns of these different genes and of the cellular arrangement in the node region leads to the definition of three zones. Anteriorly (zone a), the derivatives of the node that express HNF-3b and Shh (notochord and floor plate) are separated by forming basement membrane but are closely associated. In the area of the median pit (zone b), the future floor plate can be distinguished by a columnar arrangement of its cells. Underneath this forming epithelial layer, the presumptive notochordal cells are randomly and loosely arranged. HNF-3b and Shh are both expressed in this region, which constitutes the bulk of the node. Caudal to the border of the median pit, the cells of the node that express HNF-3b but not Shh (zone c) are closely packed without exhibiting any epithelial arrangement. Interestingly, the HNF-3b- and Ch-Tbx6L-expressing areas, forming respectively the caudal HN and the tip of the primitive streak (TPS), do not overlap.
