= Regional differentiation =

Identification of different areas of development in an early embryo

In the field of developmental biology, regional differentiation, or regional specification is the process by which different areas are identified in the development of the early embryo. The process by which the cells become specified differs between organisms.

== Cell fate determination ==
In terms of developmental commitment, a cell can either be specified or it can be determined. Specification is the first stage in cellular differentiation. A cell that is specified can have its commitment reversed while the determined state is irreversible. There are two main types of specification: autonomous and conditional. A cell specified autonomously will develop into a specific fate based upon cytoplasmic determinants with no regard to the environment the cell is in. A cell specified conditionally will develop into a specific fate based upon other surrounding cells or morphogen gradients. Another type of specification is syncytial specification, characteristic of most insect classes.

Specification in sea urchins uses both autonomous and conditional mechanisms to determine the anterior/posterior axis. The anterior/posterior axis lies along the animal/vegetal axis set up during cleavage. The micromeres induce the nearby tissue to become endoderm while the animal cells are specified to become ectoderm. The animal cells are not determined because the micromeres can induce the animal cells to also take on mesodermal and endodermal fates. It was observed that β-catenin was present in the nuclei at the vegetal pole of the blastula. Through a series of experiments, one study confirmed the role of β-catenin in the cell-autonomous specification of vegetal cell fates and the micromeres inducing ability. Treatments of lithium chloride sufficient to vegetalize the embryo resulted in increases in nuclearly localized b-catenin. Reduction of expression of β-catenin in the nucleus correlated with loss of vegetal cell fates. Transplants of micromeres lacking nuclear accumulation of β-catenin were unable to induce a second axis.

For the molecular mechanism of β-catenin and the micromeres, it was observed that Notch was present uniformly on the apical surface of the early blastula but was lost in the secondary mesenchyme cells (SMCs) during late blastula and enriched in the presumptive endodermal cells in late blastula. Notch is both necessary and sufficient for determination of the SMCs. The micromeres express the ligand for Notch, Delta, on their surface to induce the formation of SMCs.

The high nuclear levels of b-catenin results from the high accumulation of the disheveled protein at the vegetal pole of the egg. disheveled inactivates GSK-3 and prevents the phosphorylation of β-catenin. This allows β-catenin to escape degradation and enter the nucleus. The only important role of β-catenin is to activate the transcription of the gene Pmar1. This gene represses a repressor to allow micromere genes to be expressed.

The aboral/oral axis (analogous to the dorsal/ventral axes in other animals) is specified by a nodal homolog. This nodal was localized on the future oral side of the embryo. Experiments confirmed that nodal is both necessary and sufficient to promote development of the oral fate. Nodal also has a role in left/right axis formation.

== Tunicates ==
Tunicates have been a popular choice for the study of regional specification because tunicates were the first organism in which autonomous specification was discovered and tunicates are evolutionary related to vertebrates.

Early observations in tunicates led to the identification of the yellow crescent (also called the myoplasm). This cytoplasm was segregated to future muscle cells and if transplanted could induce the formation of muscle cells. The cytoplasmic determinant macho-1 was isolated as the necessary and sufficient factor for muscle cell formation. Similar to Sea urchins, the accumulation of b-catenin in the nuclei was identified as both necessary and sufficient to induce endoderm.

Two more cell fates are determined by conditional specification. The endoderm sends a fibroblast growth factor (FGF) signal to specify the notocord and the mesenchyme fates. Anterior cells respond to FGF to become notocord while posterior cells (identified by the presence of macho-1) respond to FGF to become mesenchyme.

The cytoplasm of the egg not only determines cell fate, but also determines the dorsal/ventral axis. The cytoplasm in the vegetal pole specifies this axis and removing this cytoplasm leads to a loss of axis information. The yellow cytoplasm specifies the anterior/posterior axis. When the yellow cytoplasm moves to the posterior of the egg to become posterior vegetal cytoplasm (PVC), the anterior/posterior axis is specified. Removal of the PVC leads to a loss of the axis while transplantation to the anterior reverses the axis.

== C. elegans ==
In the two cell stage, the embryo of the nematode C. elegans exhibits mosaic behavior. There are two cells, the P1 cell and the AB cell. The P1 cell was able make all of its fated cells while the AB cell could only make a portion of the cells it was fated to produce. Thus, The first division gives the autonomous specification of the two cells, but the AB cells require a conditional mechanism to produce all of its fated cells.

The AB lineage gives rise to neurons, skin, and pharynx. The P1 cell divides into EMS and P2. The EMS cell divides into MS and E. The MS lineage gives rise to pharynx, muscle, and neurons. The E lineage gives rise to intestines. The P2 cell divides into P3 and C founder cells. The C founder cells give rise to muscle, skin, and neurons. The P3 cell divides into P4 and D founder cells. The D founder cells give rise to muscle while the P4 lineage gives rise to the germ line.

- Axis specification

The anterior/posterior axis is specified by the sperm at the posterior side. At the two cell stage, the anterior cell is the AB cell while the posterior cell is the P1 cell. The dorsal/ventral axis of the animal is set by a random position of cells during the four cell stage of the embryo. The dorsal cell is the ABp cell while the ventral cell is the EMS cell.

- Localization of cytoplasmic determinants

The autonomous specification of C. elegans arises from different cytoplasmic determinants. PAR proteins are responsible for partitioning these determinants in the early embryo. These proteins are located at the periphery of the zygote and play a role in intracellular signaling. The current model for the function of these proteins is that they cause local changes in the cytoplasm that lead to different protein accumulation in the posterior vs. the anterior. Mex-5 accumulates in the anterior while PIE-1 and P granules (see below) accumulate in the posterior.

- Specification of germ line

P granules were identified as the cytoplasmic determinants. While uniformly present at fertilization, these granules become localized in the posterior P1 cell prior to the first division. These granules are further localized between each division into P cells (ex. P2, P3) until after the fourth division when they are put into the P4 cells which become the germ line.

- Specification of EMS and P1 cells

Other proteins that are likely to function as localized cytoplasmic determinants in the P1 lineage include SKN-1, PIE-1 and PAL-1.

SKN-1 is a cytoplasmic determinant that is localized in the P1 cell lineage and determines EMS cell fate. PIE-1 is localized in the P2 cell lineage and is a general repressor of transcription. SKN-1 is repressed in P2 cells and is unable to specify an EMS fate in these cells. The repressive activity of PIE-1 is required to keep the germ line lineage from differentiating.

- Specification of C and D founder cells

PAL-1 is required to specify the fates of the C and D founder cells (derived from the P2 lineage). PAL-1, however, is present in both EMS and P2. Normally, PAL-1 activity is repressed in EMS by SKN-1 but not repressed in P2. Both C and D founder cells depend on PAL-1 but there is another factor that is required to distinguish C from D.

- Specification of E lineage

The specification of the E lineage depends on signals from P2 to the EMS cell. Components of Wnt signaling were involved and were named mom genes. mom-2 is a member of the Wnt family of proteins (i.e. the signal) and mom-5 is a member of the frizzled family of proteins (i.e. the receptor).

- Specification of ABa and ABp

The specification of ABa and ABp depend on another cell-cell signaling event. A difference between these two cell types is that ABa gives rise to anterior pharynx while ABp does not contribute to pharynx. A signal from MS at the 12-cell stage induces pharynx in ABa progeny cells but not in ABp progeny. Signals from the P2 cells prevent the ABp from forming pharynx. This signal from the P2 was discovered to be APX-1 within the Delta family of proteins. These proteins are known to be ligands for the Notch protein. GLP-1, a Notch protein, is also required for specification of the fate of ABp.

== Drosophila ==
=== Anterior/posterior axis ===
The anterior/posterior patterning of Drosophila come from three maternal groups of genes. The anterior group patterns the head and thoracic segments. The posterior group patterns the abdominal segments and the terminal group patterns the anterior and posterior terminal regions called the terminalia (the acron in the anterior and the telson in the posterior).

The anterior group genes include bicoid. Bicoid functions as a graded morphogen transcription factor that localizes to the nucleus. The head of the embryo forms at the point of highest concentration of bicoid and the anterior pattern depends upon the concentration of bicoid. Bicoid works as a transcriptional activator of the gap genes hunchback (hb), buttonhead (btd), empty spiracles (ems), and orthodentical (otd) while also acting to repress translation of caudal. A different affinity for bicoid in the promoters of the genes it activates allows for the concentration dependent activation. Otd has a low affinity for bicoid, hb has a higher affinity and so will be activated at a lower bicoid concentration. Two other anterior group genes, swallow and exuperantia play a role in localizing bicoid to the anterior. Bicoid is directed to the anterior by its 3' untranslated region (3'UTR). The microtubule cytoskeleton also plays a role in localizing bicoid.

The posterior group genes include nanos. Similar to bicoid, nanos is localized to the posterior pole as a graded morphogen. The only role of nanos is to repress the maternally transcribed hunchback mRNA in the posterior. Another protein, pumilio, is required for nanos to repress hunchback. Other posterior proteins, oskar (which tethers nanos mRNA), Tudor, vasa, and Valois, localize the germ line determinants and nanos to the posterior.

In contrast to the anterior and the posterior, the positional information for the terminalia come from the follicle cells of the ovary. The terminalia are specified through the action of the Torso receptor tyrosine kinase. The follicle cells secrete Torso-like into the perivitelline space only at the poles. Torso-like cleaves the pro-peptide Trunk which appears to be the Torso ligand. Trunk activates Torso and causes a signal transduction cascade which represses the transcriptional repressor Groucho which in turn causes the activation of the terminal gap genes tailless and huckebein.

=== Segmentation and homeotic genes ===
The patterning from the maternal genes work to influence the expression of the segmentation genes. The segmentation genes are embryonically expressed genes that specify the numbers, size and polarity of the segments. The gap genes are directly influenced by the maternal genes and are expressed in local and overlapping regions along the anterior/posterior axis. These genes are influenced by not only the maternal genes, but also by epistatic interactions between the other gap genes.

The gap genes work to activate the pair-rule genes. Each pair-rule gene is expressed in seven stripes as a result of the combined effect of the gap genes and interactions between the other pair-rule genes. The pair-rule genes can be divided into two classes: the primary pair-rule genes and the secondary pair-rule genes. The primary pair-rules genes are able to influence the secondary pair-rule genes but not vice versa. The molecular mechanism between the regulation of the primary pair-rule genes was understood through a complex analysis of the regulation of even-skipped. Both positive and negative regulatory interactions by both maternal and gap genes and a unique combination of transcription factors work to express even-skipped in different parts of the embryo. The same gap gene can act positively in one stripe but negatively in another.

The expression of the pair-rule genes translate into the expression of the segment polarity genes in 14 stripes. The role of the segment polarity genes is to define to boundaries and the polarity of the segments. The means to which the genes accomplish this is believed to involve a wingless and hedgehog graded distribution or cascade of signals initiated by these proteins. Unlike the gap and the pair-rule genes, the segment polarity genes function within cells rather than within the syncytium. Thus, segment polarity genes influence patterning though signaling rather than autonomously. Also, the gap and pair-rule genes are expressed transiently while segment polarity gene expression is maintained throughout development. The continued expression of the segment polarity genes is maintained by a feedback loop involving hedgehog and wingless.

While the segmentation genes can specify the number, size, and polarity of segments, homeotic genes can specify the identity of the segment. The homeotic genes are activated by gap genes and pair-rule genes. The Antennapedia complex and the bithorax complex on the third chromosome contain the major homeotic genes required for specifying segmental identity (actually parasegmental identity). These genes are transcription factors and are expressed in overlapping regions that correlate with their position along the chromosome. These transcription factors regulate other transcription factors, cell surface molecules with roles in cell adhesion, and other cell signals. Later during development, homeotic genes are expressed in the nervous system in a similar anterior/posterior pattern. Homeotic genes are maintained throughout development through the modification of the condensation state of their chromatin. Polycomb genes maintain the chromatin in an inactive conformation while trithorax genes maintain chromatin in an active conformation.

All homeotic genes share a segment of protein with a similar sequence and structure called the homeodomain (the DNA sequence is called the homeobox). This region of the homeotic proteins binds DNA. This domain was found in other developmental regulatory proteins, such as bicoid, as well in other animals including humans. Molecular mapping revealed that the HOX gene cluster has been inherited intact from a common ancestor of flies and mammals which indicates that it is a fundamental developmental regulatory system.

=== Dorsal/ventral axis ===
The maternal protein, Dorsal, functions like a graded morphogen to set the ventral side of the embryo (the name comes from mutations which led to a dorsalized phenotype). Dorsal is like bicoid in that it is a nuclear protein; however, unlike bicoid, dorsal is uniformly distributed throughout the embryo. The concentration difference arises from differential nuclear transport. The mechanism by which dorsal becomes differentially located into the nuclei occurs in three steps.

The first step happens in the dorsal side of the embryo. The nucleus in the oocyte moves along a microtubule track to one side of the oocyte. This side sends a signal, gurken, to the torpedo receptors on the follicle cells. The torpedo receptor is found in all follicle cells; however, the gurken signal is only found on the anterior dorsal side of the oocyte. The follicle cells change shape and synthetic properties to distinguish the dorsal side from the ventral side. These dorsal follicle cells are unable to produce the pipe protein required for step two.

The second step is a signal from the ventral follicle cells back to the oocyte. This signal acts after the egg has left the follicle cells so this signal is stored in the perivitelline space. The follicle cells secrete windbeutel, nudel, and pipe, which create a protease-activating complex. Because the dorsal follicle cells do not express pipe, they are not able to create this complex. Later, the embryo secretes three inactive proteases (gastrulation defective, snake, and Easter) and an inactive ligand (spätzle) into the perivitelline space. These proteases are activated by the complex and cleave spätzle into an active form. This active protein is distributed in a ventral to dorsal gradient. Toll is a receptor tyrosine kinase for spätzle and transduces the graded spätzle signal through the cytoplasm to phosphorylate cactus. Once phosphorylated, cactus no longer binds to dorsal, leaving it free to enter the nucleus. The amount of released dorsal depends on the amount of spätzle protein present.

The third step is the regional expression of zygotic genes decapentaplegic (dpp), zerknüllt, tolloid, twist, snail, and rhomboid due to the expression of dorsal in the nucleus. High levels of dorsal are required to turn on transcription of twist and snail. Low levels of dorsal can activate the transcription of rhomboid. Dorsal represses the transcription of zerknüllt, tolloid, and dpp. The zygotic genes also interact with each other to restrict their domains of expression.

== Amphibians ==
=== Dorsal/ventral axis and organizer ===
Between fertilization and the first cleavage in Xenopus embryos, the cortical cytoplasm of the zygote rotates relative to the central cytoplasm by about 30 degrees to uncover (in some species) a gray crescent in the marginal or middle region of the embryo. The cortical rotation is powered by microtubules motors moving along parallel arrays of cortical microtubules. This gray crescent marks the future dorsal side of the embryo. Blocking this rotation prevents formation of the dorsal/ventral axis. By the late blastula stage, the Xenopus embryos have a clear dorsal/ventral axis.

In the early gastrula, most of the tissue in the embryo is not determined. The one exception is the anterior portion of the dorsal blastopore lip. When this tissue was transplanted to another part of the embryo, it developed as it normally would. In addition, this tissue was able to induce the formation of another dorsal/ventral axis. Hans Spemann named this region the organizer and the induction of the dorsal axis the primary induction.

The organizer is induced from a dorsal vegetal region called the Nieuwkoop center. There are many different developmental potentials throughout the blastula stage embryos. The vegetal cap can give rise to only endodermal cell types while the animal cap can give rise to only ectodermal cell types. The marginal zone, however, can give rise to most structures in the embryo including mesoderm. A series of experiments by Pieter Nieuwkoop showed that if the marginal zone is removed and the animal and vegetal caps placed next to each other, the mesoderm comes from the animal cap and the dorsal tissues are always adjacent to the dorsal vegetal cells. Thus, this dorsal vegetal region, named the Nieuwkoop center, was able to induce the formation of the organizer.

Twinning assays identified Wnt proteins as molecules from the Nieuwkoop center that could specify the dorsal/ventral axis. In twinning assays, molecules are injected into the ventral blastomere of a four-cell stage embryo. If the molecules specify the dorsal axis, dorsal structures will be formed on the ventral side. Wnt proteins were not necessary to specify the axis, but examination of other proteins in the Wnt pathway led to the discovery that β-catenin was necessary. β-catenin is present in the nuclei on the dorsal side but not on the ventral side. β-catenin levels are regulated by GSK-3. When active, GSK-3 phosphorylates free β-catenin, which is then targeted for degradation. There are two possible molecules that might regulate GSK-3: GBP (GSK-3 Binding Protein) and Dishevelled. The current model is that these act together to inhibit GSK-3 activity. Dishevelled is able to induce a secondary axis when overexpressed and is present at higher levels on the dorsal side after cortical rotation (Symmetry Breaking and Cortical Rotation). Depletion of Dishevelled, however, has no effect. GBP has an effect both when depleted and overexpressed. Recent evidence, however, showed that Xwnt11, a Wnt molecule expressed in Xenopus, was both sufficient and necessary for dorsal axis formation.

Mesoderm formation comes from two signals: one for the ventral portion and one for the dorsal portion. Animal cap assays were used to determine the molecular signals from the vegetal cap that are able to induce the animal cap to form mesoderm. In an animal cap assay, molecules of interest are either applied in medium that the cap is grown in or injected as mRNA in an early embryo. These experiments identified a group of molecules, the transforming growth factor-β (TGF-β) family. With dominant negative forms of TGF-β, early experiments were only able to identify the family of molecules involved not the specific member. Recent experiments have identified the Xenopus nodal-related proteins (Xnr-1, Xnr-2, and Xnr-4) as the mesoderm-inducing signals. Inhibitors of these ligands prevents mesoderm formation and these proteins show a graded distribution along the dorsal/ventral axis.

Vegetally localized mRNA, VegT and possibly Vg1, are involved in inducing the endoderm. It is hypothesized that VegT also activates the Xnr-1,2,4 proteins. VegT acts as a transcription factor to activate genes specifying endodermal fate while Vg1 acts as a paracrine factor.

β-catenin in the nucleus activates two transcription factors: siamois and twin. β-catenin also acts synergistically with VegT to produce high levels of Xnr-1,2,4. Siamois will act synergistically with Xnr-1,2,4 to activate a high level of the transcription factors such as goosecoid in the organizer. Areas in the embryo with lower levels of Xnr-1,2,4 will express ventral or lateral mesoderm. Nuclear β-catenin works synergistically with the mesodermal cell fate signal to create the signaling activity of the Nieuwkoop center to induce the formation of the organizer in the dorsal mesoderm.

=== Organizer function ===
There are two classes of genes that are responsible for the organizer's activity: transcription factors and secreted proteins. Goosecoid (which has a homology between bicoid and gooseberry) is the first known gene to be expressed in the organizer and is both sufficient and necessary to specify a secondary axis.

The organizer induces ventral mesoderm to become lateral mesoderm, induces the ectoderm to form neural tissue and induces dorsal structures in the endoderm. The mechanism behind these inductions is an inhibition of the bone morphogenetic protein 4 signaling pathway that ventralizes the embryo. In the absence of these signals, ectoderm reverts to its default state of neural tissue. Four of the secreted molecules from the organizer, chordin, noggin, follistatin and Xenopus nodal-related-3 (Xnr-3), directly interact with BMP-4 and block its ability to bind to its receptor. Thus, these molecules create a gradient of BMP-4 along the dorsal/ventral axis of the mesoderm.

BMP-4 mainly acts in trunk and tail region of the embryo while a different set of signals work in the head region. Xwnt-8 is expressed throughout the ventral and lateral mesoderm. The endomesoderm (can give rise to either endoderm or mesoderm) at the leading edge of the archenteron (future anterior) secrete three factors Cerberus, Dickkopf, and Frzb. While Cerberus and Frzb bind directly to Xwnt-8 to prevent it from binding to its receptor, Cerberus is also capable of binding to BMP-4 and Xnr1. Furthermore, Dickkopf binds to LRP-5, a transmembrane protein important for the signalling pathway of Xwnt-8, leading to endocytosis of LRP-5 and eventually to an inhibition of the Xwnt-8 pathway.

=== Anterior/posterior axis ===
The anterior/posterior patterning of the embryo occurs sometime before or during gastrulation. The first cells to involute have anterior inducing activity while the last cells have posterior inducing activity. The anterior inducing ability comes from the Xwnt-8 antagonizing signals Cereberus, Dickkopf and Frzb discussed above. Anterior head development also requires the function of IGFs (insulin-like growth factors) expressed in the dorsal midline and the anterior neural tube. It is believed that IGFs function by activating a signal transduction cascade that interferes and inhibits both Wnt signaling and BMP signaling. In the posterior, two candidates for posteriorizing signals include eFGF, a fibroblast growth factor homologue, and retinoic acid.

== Fish ==
The basis for axis formation in zebrafish parallels what is known in amphibians. The embryonic shield has the same function as the dorsal lip of the blastopore and acts as the organizer. When transplanted, it is able to organize a secondary axis and removing it prevents the formation of dorsal structures. β-catenin also has a role similar to its role in amphibians. It accumulates in the nucleus only on the dorsal side; ventral β-catenin induces a secondary axis. It activates the expression of Squint (a Nodal related signaling protein aka ndr1) and Bozozok (a homeodomain transcription factor similar to Siamois) which act together to activate goosecoid in the embryonic shield.

As in Xenopus, mesoderm induction involves two signals: one from the vegetal pole to induce ventral mesoderm and one from the Nieuwkoop center equivalent dorsal vegetal cells to induce dorsal mesoderm.

The signals from the organizer also parallel to those from amphibians. Noggin and chordin homologue Chordino, binds to a BMP family member, BMP2B, to block it from ventralizing the embryo. Dickkopf binds to a Wnt homolog Wnt8 to block it from ventralizing and posteriorizing the embryo.

There is a third pathway regulated by β-catenin in fish. β-catenin activates the transcription factor stat3. Stat3 coordinates cell movements during gastrulation and contributes to establishing planar polarity.

== Birds ==
The dorsal/ventral axis is defined in chick embryos by the orientation of the cells with respect to the yolk. Ventral is down with respect to the yolk while animal is up. This axis is defined by the creation of a pH difference "inside" and "outside" of the blastoderm between the subgerminal space and the albumin on the outside. The subgerminal space has a pH of 6.5 while the albumin on the outside has a pH of 9.5.

The anterior/posterior axis is defined during the initial tilting of the embryo when the eggshell is being deposited. The egg is constantly being rotated in a consistent direction and there is a partial stratification of the yolk; the lighter yolk components will be near one end of the blastoderm and will become the future posterior. The molecular basis of the posterior is not known, however, the accumulation of cells eventually results in the posterior marginal zone (PMZ).

The PMZ is the equivalent of the Nieuwkoop center is that its role is to induce Hensen's node. Transplantation of the PMZ results in induction of a primitive streak, however, PMZ does not contribute to the streak itself. Similar to the Nieuwkoop center, the PMZ expresses both Vg1 and nuclear localized β-catenin.

The Hensen's node is equivalent to the organizer. Transplantation of Hensen's node results in the formation of a secondary axis. Hensen's node is the site where gastrulation begins and it becomes the dorsal mesoderm. Hensen's node is formed from the induction of PMZ on the anterior part of the PMZ called Koller's sickle. When the primitive streak forms, these cells expand out to become Hensen's node. These cells express goosecoid consistent with their role as the organizer.

The function of the organizer in chick embryos is similar to that of amphibians and fish, however, there are some differences. Similar to the amphibians and fish, the organizer does secrete Chordin, Noggin and Nodal proteins that antagonize BMP signaling and dorsalize the embryo. Neural induction, however, does not rely entirely on inhibiting the BMP signaling. Overexpression of BMP antagonists is not enough induce formation of neurons nor overexpressing BMP block formation of neurons. While the whole story is unknown for neural induction, FGFs seem to play a role in mesoderm and neural induction. The anterior/posterior patterning of the embryo requires signals like cerberus from the hypoblast and the spatial regulation of retinoic acid accumulation to activate the 3' Hox genes in the posterior neuroectoderm (hindbrain and spinal cord).

== Mammals ==
The earliest specification in mouse embryos occurs between trophoblast and inner cell mass cells in the outer polar cells and the inner apolar cells respectively. These two groups become specified at the eight-cell stage during compaction, but do not become determined until they reach the 64-cell stage. If an apolar cell is transplanted to the outside during the 8-32 cell stage, that cell will develop as a trophoblast cell.

The anterior/posterior axis in the mouse embryo is specified by two signaling centers. In the mouse embryo, the egg forms a cylinder with the epiblast forming a cup at the distal end of that cylinder. The epiblast is surrounded by the visceral endoderm, the equivalent of the hypoblast of humans and chicks. Signals for the anterior/posterior axis come from the primitive node. The other important site is the anterior visceral endoderm (AVE). The AVE lies anterior to the node's most anterior position and lies just under the epiblast in the region that will become occupied by migrating endomesoderm to form head mesoderm and foregut endoderm. The AVE interacts with the node to specify the most anterior structures. Thus, the node is able to form a normal trunk, but requires signals from the AVE to form a head.

The discovery of the homeobox in Drosophila flies and its conservation in other animals has led to advancements in understanding the anterior/posterior patterning. Most of the Hox genes in mammals show an expression pattern that parallels the homeotic genes in flies. In mammals, there are four copies of the Hox genes. Each set of Hox genes are paralogous to the others (Hox1a is a paralogue of Hox1b, etc.) These paralogs show overlapping expression patterns and could act redundantly. However, double mutations in paralogous genes can also act synergistically indicating that the genes must work together for function.

== See also ==
- Pattern formation
