= Kees Weijer =

- Education: Utrecht University
- Known for: Cell-cell signalling and chemotactic cell movement during development
- Website: https://www.lifesci.dundee.ac.uk/people/kees-weijer

Kees Weijer is a professor of Developmental Physiology and the Head of Systems Biology at the School of Life Sciences, University of Dundee.

== Education ==
Weijer acquired all of his degrees from Utrecht University (Netherlands): from 1970 to 1985 a Bachelor of Science (B.Sc.), a Master of Science (M.Sc.), and a PhD in Biology. In 1991, Weijer received his ‘’Habilitation’’.

== Career ==
Weijer worked as an assistant in the Zoological Institute of LMU Munich in Germany during 1982 and 1996. During this time, he was promoted from assistant to lecturer, then to senior lecturer. He has worked at the University of Dundee since 1996 and was initially appointed as senior lecturer in the previous Department of Anatomy and Physiology. In 2008, he was promoted to a principal lecturer.

== Research ==
Weijer’s main research is focused on understanding cell-to-cell signalling and its relationship with cell behaviour (i.e., differentiation, division, shape change and movement). Most of his research that is based around cell movement is conducted using the model organisms of the chick embryo and the amoeba Dictyostelium discoideum.

He has helped to develop an enhanced microscopy technique to make it possible to visualise individual cells of the primitive streak in embryonic development. He was also one of the developers of the Active Vertex Model (AVM), a computerised model to visualise how collective behaviour emerges in tissue cells.

== Honours ==
- Wolfson Research Medal, the Royal Society, 2002
- Elected Fellow, Royal Society of Edinburgh, 2004
- Elected Member, European Molecular Biology Organization, 2023
