= Spemann–Mangold organizer =

Cell group in amphibian embryos

The Spemann–Mangold organizer is a group of cells that are responsible for the induction of the neural tissues during development in amphibian embryos. First described in 1924 by Hans Spemann and Hilde Mangold, the introduction of the organizer provided evidence that the fate of cells can be influenced by factors from other cell populations. This discovery significantly impacted the world of developmental biology and fundamentally changed the understanding of early development.

== Discovery ==
The Spemann–Mangold organizer was first described in 1924 by Hans Spemann and Hilde Mangold. Prior to its discovery, it had been hypothesized by multiple groups that there exists a portion of the developing embryo that serves as an "organization center". In 1918 and 1921, Hans Spemann showed that transplanting presumptive epidermis into the area of presumptive neural tissue would change the fate of the transplanted cells to that of their new destination, and likewise when he transplanted presumptive neural tissue to where the presumptive epidermis was forming. Spemann also showed that by transplanting a piece from the upper blastopore lip into an area of presumptive epidermis, a secondary embryonic primordium formed, including a secondary neural tube, notochord and somites. Additionally, splitting the embryo in half and rotating the animal pole in respect to the vegetal pole resulted in determination spreading from the lower vegetal pole, where the upper blastopore lip was located, to the upper animal half. He also fused together two identical halves from different embryos and observed formation of the neural plate. This work provided the initial evidence to support the notion that there existed some “organization center” that was determined prior to the other embryonic tissue and influenced the determination of surrounding cells.

To test this Spemann's hypothesis, one of his PhD students, Hilde Mangold, performed experiments between 1921 and 1922 using embryos from Triturus cristatus and Triturus taeniatus that were undergoing gastrulation. The experiment performed resembled the one done in 1918, however instead of a homoplastic transplantation she used embryos from two species of newt that are closely related. One of the benefits of using the cristatus and taeniatus embryos was that the cristatus embryo cells lacked pigment so the fate of the transplant could be easily tracked when placed among the pigmented taeniatus cells. A piece from the upper blastopore lip was removed from the cristatus embryo and transplanted into a ventral region of presumptive epidermis in the taeniatus embryo, away from the developing host blastopore. Following this transplant, she observed the formation of a secondary embryonic primordium, consistent with their previous work. This secondary embryo had the normal features of the primary embryo, including structures such as the neural plate and notochord, although they lagged slightly in development. Sectioning of the embryo showed that cells from the transplant were incorporated into the mesoderm, the neural plate, and constituted almost the entire notochord of the secondary embryo. It was further shown that the neural plate was almost entirely composed of cells from the host taeniatus embryo. These experiments concluded that a piece of the upper blastopore lip can be transplanted into the indifferent tissue of another embryo and induce the host tissue into the formation of a secondary embryo, therefore implicating the transplanted tissue as an "organization center".

The discovery of the Spemann–Mangold Organizer is considered one of the most influential findings in the field of developmental biology and resulted in Hans Spemann being awarded the Nobel Prize in 1935 for his work (Mangold tragically died before the Nobel prize was awarded, thus was not eligible). The mechanisms of how this organizer operates has been the subject of decades of follow up research.

== Mechanism ==
The Spemann–Mangold organizer refers to the population of cells in the Xenopus laevis embryo that establishes the dorso-ventral and antero-posterior axes. While an organizer exists in other species, the term Spemann–Mangold organizer is specifically reserved for the amphibian embryo. The Spemann–Mangold organizer is located in the dorsal blastopore lip, where gastrulation movements originate. Initial organizer cells migrate and localize anteriorly. The organizer cells are subdivided into head, trunk, and tail organizers. These distinct cell populations have different inducers and set up unique growth factor gradients as they migrate. Secondary cell-cell interactions further establish the axes as gastrulation and neurulation continues.

The Spemann–Mangold organizer is particularly important in mesoderm induction. In the three signal model, the dorsalizing signal from the organizer is mediated by bone morphogenic protein (BMP) gradients to give rise to cells of mesodermal fate. The other two signals arise from the vegetal pole and induce the extreme ventral and dorsal mesoderm in the overlying marginal zone.

In order for the Spemann–Mangold organizer to form, maternal factors, such as mVegT must be present in the vegetal cap. Wnt pathway signaling is the other major maternal cue in the formation of the organizer and is required autonomously for expression of organizer genes. Siamois (Sia) and Twin (Xtwn) are expressed at the onset of zygotic gene expression in the blastula and become activated by Wnt signaling in the blastula Chordin- and Noggin-expressing (BCNE) center. Sia and Xtwn can function as homo- or heterodimers to bind a conserved P3 site within the proximal element (PE) of the goosecoid (Gsc) promoter. Wnt signaling also acts with mVegT to upregulate Xnr5, secreted from the Nieuwkoop center, in the interior dorso-vegetal region, which will then induce additional transcription factors such as Xnr1, Xnr2, Gsc, chordin (chd). The final cue is mediated by Nodal/activin signaling, inducing transcription factors, that in combination with Sia, will induce the cerberus (cer) gene.

The organizer has both transcription and secreted factors. Transcription factors include goosecoid, Lim1, and Xnot, which are all homeodomain proteins. Goosecoid was the first organizer gene discovered, providing “the first visualization of Spemann–Mangold organizer cells and of their dynamic changes during gastrulation”. While it was the first to be studied, it is not the first gene to be activated. Following transcriptional activation by Sia and Xtwn, Gsc is expressed in a subset of cells encompassing 60° of arc on the dorsal marginal zone. Expression of Gsc activates the expression of secreted signaling molecules. Ventral injection of Gsc leads to a phenotype as seen in Spemann and Mangold's original experiment: a twinned axis.

Secreted factors from the organizer form gradients in the embryo to differentiate the tissues.

Factor	Mechanism
Chordin	BMP antagonist
Noggin	BMP antagonist
Follistatin	Activin and BMP antagonist
Frzb1	Wnt antagonist
Secreted frizzled-related protein-2 (sFrp2)	Wnt antagonist
crescent	Wnt antagonist
dickkopf-1	Wnt antagonist
cerberus	Nodal, Wnt, and BMP antagonist
anti-dorsalizing morphogenic protein (Admp)	Growth factor

== International recognition ==
After the discovery of the Sepmann-Mangold Organizer, many labs rushed to be the first to discover the inducing factors responsible for this organization. This created a large international impact with labs in Japan, Russia, and Germany changing the way they viewed and studied developmental organization. However, due to the slow progress in the field, many labs move research interests away from the organizer, but not before the impact of the discovery was made. 60 years after the discovery of the organizer, many Nobel Prizes were given to developmental biologists for work that was influenced by the Organizer.

=== Japan ===
Until the mid 19th century, Japan was a closed society that did not participate in advances in modern biology until later in that century. At that time, many students who went abroad to study in American and European labs, came back with new ideas about approaches to developmental sciences. When the returning students would try to incorporate their new ideas into the Japanese experimental embryology, they were rejected by the members of Japanese Biological Society. After the publication of the Spemann–Mangold organizer, many more students went to study abroad in European Labs, to learn much more about this organizer and returned to use that knowledge to aid in huge advantages in embryonic biology at the time. The discovery of the organizer influenced many embryonic induction projects in Japan. For example, T. Yamada created the double potential theory for the induction process in embryos. Another discovery after the organizer discovery was the modified Vogt fate map using newt and Xenopus blastula by researcher Osamu Nakamura. The new concept of transdifferentiation was proposed by T.S. Okada and G. Eguchi. These discoveries and many more in Japan were inspired by the publication of the organizer by Spemann and Mangold.

=== Russia ===
The publication of the Spemann-Mangold organizer also has a huge influence on the Russian developmental research. At first the Spemann's organizer was not accepted in Russia. The Russian scientists did not agree with the idea of embryonic inducers (morphogens) because the Russian researchers focused on developmental patterns in evolution. It was not until another researcher, A. Gurwitch, published his theory of embryonic fields that Russian scientists began to accept other theories of development, including the Sepmann-Mangold organizer, as it agreed with many of the concepts of Gurwitch's theory. With this new influence, labs in Moscow and Leningrad began to focus on the genetic control of individual development instead of evolutionary development. Russia began to analyze morphogenetic tissue interactions in a similar manner as Spemann by using the eye-lens system. From this research, Russia was able to add to the field with their research on lens and neural induction, and the discovery of the lens induction influenced the beginning of developmental mechanic labs to open in Russia.

=== Germany ===
In Germany, the period immediately following the Spemann–Mangold publication was known as a period with little progress, as many questions that the new organizer produced were left unsolved. The holistic view of the Spemann–Mangold organizer needed supplemental research since many methods were not available at the time of that publication. Spemann initiated the movement of developmental and molecular biology and influenced many projects in Germany based on his findings. Spemann's work with the minced organizer tissue indicated the presence of morphogens which then lead to the double gradient hypothesis of Toivonen and Saxén. This led to the discovery that the tissues studies contained factors that caused inducing activity. Because of the Spemann–Mangold organizer discovery and suggestion of morphogens, labs in Germany were able to further learn about the mechanisms behind development with new methods to further the knowledge in the field.
