= FAM131A =

Human gene and the protein it encodes

Identifiers
- Aliases: FAM131A, C3orf40, FLAT715, PRO1378, family with sequence similarity 131 member A
- External IDs: MGI: 1925658; HomoloGene: 82234; GeneCards: FAM131A; OMA:FAM131A - orthologs

Gene location (Human)
Chr.	Chromosome 3 (human)
Band	3q27.1	Start	184,335,926 bp
Band	3q27.1	End	184,348,421 bp

Gene location (Mouse)
Chr.	Chromosome 16 (mouse)
Band	16 A3|16	Start	20,511,991 bp
Band	16 A3|16	End	20,521,798 bp
RNA expression pattern
Bgee	Human / Mouse (ortholog); Top expressed in: prefrontal cortex; right frontal lobe; secondary oocyte; dorsolateral prefrontal cortex; Brodmann area 9; middle temporal gyrus; orbitofrontal cortex; Brodmann area 46; right hemisphere of cerebellum; cingulate gyrus / Top expressed in: dentate gyrus of hippocampal formation granule cell; primary visual cortex; superior frontal gyrus; hippocampus proper; spermatid; primary motor cortex; subiculum; muscle of thigh; prefrontal cortex; cingulate gyrus; More reference expression data
BioGPS	n/a
Orthologs
Species	Human	Mouse
Entrez	131408	78408
Ensembl	ENSG00000175182	ENSMUSG00000050821
UniProt	Q6UXB0	Q8BWU3
RefSeq (mRNA)	NM_001171093; NM_144635; NM_001366133; NM_001366134	NM_133778
RefSeq (protein)	NP_001164564; NP_653236; NP_001353062; NP_001353063	NP_598539
Location (UCSC)	Chr 3: 184.34 – 184.35 Mb	Chr 16: 20.51 – 20.52 Mb
PubMed search
- Wikidata
View/Edit Human	View/Edit Mouse

FAM131A (Family with Sequence Similarity 131 Member A) is a protein that is encoded by the FAM131A gene in humans. Aliases for FAM131A include C3orf40, FLAT715, and PRO1378.

== Gene ==
The gene, FAM131A, which is found on the plus strand of chromosome 3 (3q27.1), spans 7,847 base pairs in humans. The FAM131A gene transcribes an mRNA sequence that is 2,437 nucleotides. FAM131A is most highly expressed in the brain, with a low tissue specificity.

Conceptual Translation of Human FAM131A. Annotations indicate start codon, exon boundaries, polyadenylation signals, polyadenylation sites, disordered region, region excluded from isoform 2, and stop codon. Amino acids conserved from distant orthologs are bolded.

== Protein ==
The FAM131A protein in humans is 366 amino acids in length, with a theoretical molecular weight of 39.5 kDa and a theoretical isoelectric point of 4.59. There have only been two isoforms found for the protein this gene encodes in humans, and isoform two is shorter at the N-terminus than isoform one due to amino acids 1-85 being absent in isoform two. It was also determined that Asparagine, Threonine, and Isoleucine are represented less in the FAM131A protein in comparison to most human proteins. However, Serine is more highly represented in the FAM131A protein in comparison to most human proteins. The FAM131A protein is predicted to be contained within the nucleus and in the nucleolus, and is predicted to be primarily localized to the nucleoli rim within the cell.

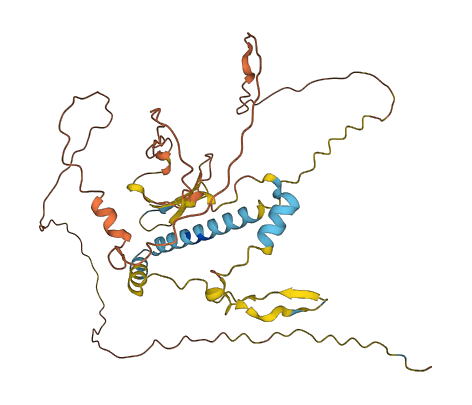
Predicted tertiary structure of human FAM131A protein from AlphaFold.

=== Post-translational modifications ===
Five different post-translational modification sites have been predicted for the FAM131A protein. These include three different theoretical sumoylation sites and two different theoretical lysine acetylation sites.

=== Interacting proteins ===
A few proteins have been found to be co-expressed alongside the FAM131 protein, including Von Willebrand Factor A Domain-Containing 5B2 (VWA5B2), Grid 2 Interacting Protein (GRID2IP), and Chordin (CHRD).

== Homology ==
Multiple sequence alignment of FAM131 in distant orthologs. The consensus sequences indicate highly conserved amino acids with an uppercase letter, moderately conserved amino acids with a lowercase letter, and low conservation of an amino acid with a dot.

Orthologs were found for FAM131A in mammals (sequence identity ranging from 73.6%-92.3%), reptiles (sequence identity ranging from 48.5%-56.4%), birds (sequence identity ranging from 49.6%-54.0%), amphibians (sequence identity ranging from 47.1%-52.1%), and fish (sequence identity ranging from 26.2%-56.5%). The furthest date of divergence was found in fish, specifically Pretromyzon marinus, otherwise known as the Sea lamprey, at 599 million years ago. FAM131A was not found in any invertebrates, which could indicate that FAM131A is restricted to vertebrates.

=== Table of orthologs ===
Species Name	Common name	Date of Divergence (mya)	Accession number	Sequence length (AA)	Sequence identity to human protein
Homo sapiens	Humans	0	NP_653236	366	100%
Mus musculus	House mouse	87	NP_598539	361	92.3%
Phascolarctos cinereus	Koala	160	XP_020861440	362	73.6%
Sarcophilus harrisii	Tasmanian devil	160	XP_031823960	283	64.1%
Alligator mississippiensis	American alligator	319	XP_019339708	324	56.4%
Gallus gallus	Chicken	319	XP_003641841	338	54.0%
Haliaeetus leucocephalus	Bald eagle	319	XP_010571279	275	49.6%
Aptenodytes forsteri	Emporer penguin	319	XP_009286349	275	49.6%
Python bivittatus	Burmese python	319	XP_025029736	302	48.5%
Rhinatrema bivittatum	Two-lined caecilian	353	XP_029472185	290	52.1%
Xenopus tropicalis	Tropical clawed frog	353	XP_004914460	344	50.0%
Rana temporaria	Common frog	353	XP_040205721	348	47.6%
Bufo bufo	Common toad	353	XP_040284457	261	47.1%
Protopterus annectens	West African lungfish	408	XP_043926343.1	361	56.5%
Danio rerio	Zebrafish	431	NP_001093625	293	43.4%
Oryzias latipes	Japanese rice fish	431	XP_004079308	338	34.4%
Cheilinus undulatus	Humphead wrasse	431	XP_041660114	318	31.4%
Amblyraja radiata	Thorny skate	464	XP_032888076	380	51.8%
Petromyzon marinus	Sea lamprey	599	XP_032802778	383	26.2%

== Clinical significance ==
Studies have found having high expression of FAM131A is prognostically unfavorable for patients with ovarian cancer or endometrial cancer.
