= Koller's sickle =

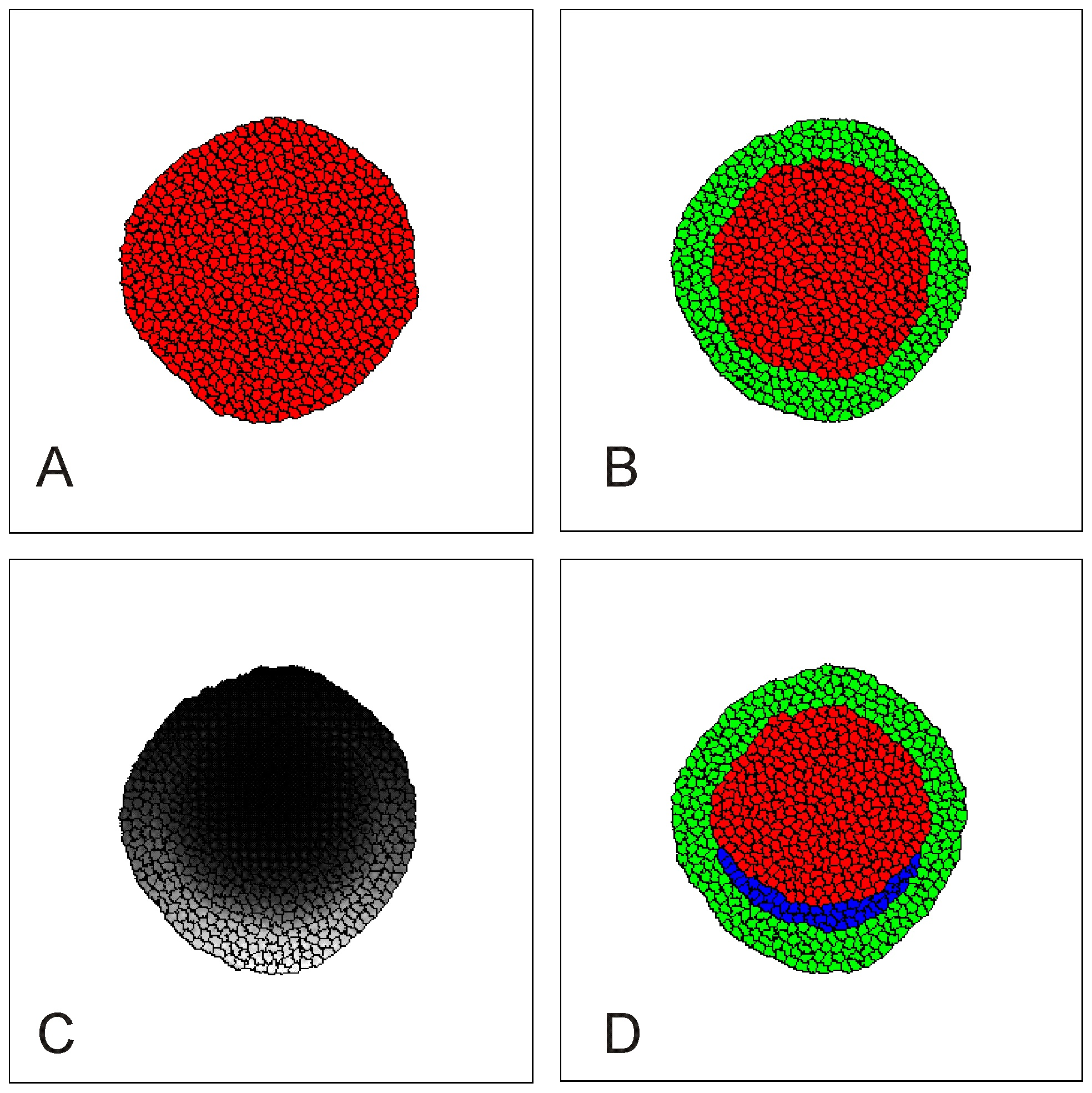
Avian epiblast differentiation. Koller's sickle composes the blue-colored area in image D, associated with the green-colored area opaca and the red-colored area pellucida.

In avian gastrulation, Koller's sickle is a local thickening of cells at the posterior edge of the upper layer of the area pellucida called the epiblast. Koller's sickle is crucial for avian development, due to its critical role in inducing the differentiation of various avian body parts. Koller's sickle induces primitive streak and Hensen's node, which are major components of avian gastrulation. Avian gastrulation is a process by which developing cells in an avian embryo move relative to one another in order to form the three germ layers (endoderm, mesoderm, and ectoderm).

== In-depth definition ==
The thickening of the epiblast in Koller's sickle acts as a margin separating sheets of cells from posterior side of avian blastoderms from hypoblasts and area opaca endoderm. The blastoderm is a single layer of cells, and the hypoblast and area opaca endoderm cells lie directly below the blastoderm. Koller's sickle arises from the midpoint, between the hypoblast cells and the area opaca endoderm. As blastoderm cells migrate anteriorly they push primary hypoblast cells and form a secondary hypoblast known as the endoblast. Also during this migration, Koller's sickle prevents the hypoblast cells and the area opaca cells from making contact with the blastoderm, which allows the primitive streak to form.

== Formation of the primitive streak ==
Mesoderm differentiation above Koller's sickle.

The primitive streak in the avian embryo is induced by the posterior marginal zone (PMZ) of Koller's sickle, which can also induce Hensen's node. If cell movement in the PMZ is blocked, the primitive streak does not form. Thus, the PMZ acts as an organizer. Cells in marginal zones of the embryo, like the PMZ, are key to development and cell fate determination in chick embryos.

Avian gastrulation occurs as cells move though the primitive streak. Hence, primitive streak is analogous to the blastopore lip in amphibian gastrulation. The primitive streak develops from Koller's sickle and the epiblast of the avian embryo. As the cells of Koller's sickle migrate during gastrulation, they form different portions of the primitive streak. The anterior cells of Koller's sickle become the anterior region of the primitive streak, known as Hensen's node. Similarly, the posterior cells of Koller's sickle form the posterior region of the primitive streak. This differential movement is due to expression of different mesodermal marker genes among the cells located in different areas of Koller's sickle. Chordin is expressed in cells of the anterior streak, while Wnt8c is expressed in cells of the posterior streak. The movement is coordinated by a Wnt signaling pathway which is activated by fibroblast growth factors from the hypoblast.

=== Role of the primitive streak ===
The primitive streak is key in the development of the major body axes. The primitive groove forms as a depression in the primitive streak as it is developing, and allows a space for migrating cells to move into the deeper layers of the embryo. Cells migrate by entering through the dorsal side and moving toward the ventral side of the avian embryo, separating the left and right sections of the embryo. The primitive pit in Hensen's node, at the anterior end of the primitive streak, allows cells to enter which will form the notochord and prechordal plate. Cells that move through the center of the streak will become the heart and kidneys. The lateral plate and the extraembryonic mesoderm arise from the cells that enter at the posterior end of the primitive streak. Epiblast cells near the primitive streak form the neural plate and other dorsal structures, while the epiblast cells far from the streak become epidermis.

== Gene influence ==
Koller's sickle is one of two regions (the other being the caudal boundary region of the area opaca) where expression patterns for genes important for gastrulation are localized. For example, the gene Nodal is only expressed in Koller's sickle.

While a single gene has not been isolated for the creation of Koller's sickle, there is evidence that the Homeobox gene Hex influences Koller's sickle development. The transcript cHex, which is a product of Hex, has been detected in Koller's sickle during chick embryogenesis. cHex is also involved with the formation of the hypoblast, the endoderm in an anterior arc that overlaps the cardiogenic region, pharyngeal endoderm immediately adjacent to the forming myocardium, in the endocardium, and in the liver and thyroid gland primordia.

It is also possible that the Homeobox gene goosecoid (GSC) is involved in the formation of Koller's sickle, as Koller's sickle cells are the first to express the goosecoid transcript. In general, the goosecoid gene is thought to be involved in the development of the chicken organizer during gastrulation.

== History ==
=== Discovery ===
Koller's sickle was originally described by August Rauber in 1876. Because of this Koller's sickle is sometimes referred to as Rauber's sickle.

In 1926, Ludwig Graper first studied the involvement of Koller's sickle in the formation of the primitive streak. The cell movements reminded him of a dance called the Polonaise, in which dancers moved in parallel lines and in which they move from the back of the group to the center. It was not until 2007 that the mechanism for these movements was discovered, by Voiculescu and his associates. They determined that cells move to the center of the epiblast following the activation of the Wnt planar cell polarity pathway by fibroblast growth factors made by the hypoblast.

== Current research ==
There is still a lot that is unknown regarding Koller's sickle, but research is ongoing. By implanting a fragment of quail Koller's sickle into a chicken blastoderm, Drs. Callebaut and Van Nueten observed the formation of a normal secondary primitive streak, mesoderm, and definitive endoderm. This led them to the conclusion that Koller's sickle is the early avian representation of the organizer, and that there is homology between Koller's sickle in avians and the blastoporus in amphibians. Drs. Callebaut and Van Nueten also optimized a method for preparation of unincubated avian eggs, and from this they demonstrated the fact that embryonic regulation is a result of the spatial distribution of Koller's sickle tissue. Additionally, Drs. Callebaut and Van Nueten were able to determine that the differentiation of Koller' sickle cells to sickle endoblast is irreversible, and that the sickle endoblast induces early neurulation; they did this by implanting Koller's sickle tissue into different parts of unincubated chicken blastoderms and observing the effects.
