= Epiblast =

Cells that give rise to the embryo in amniote development

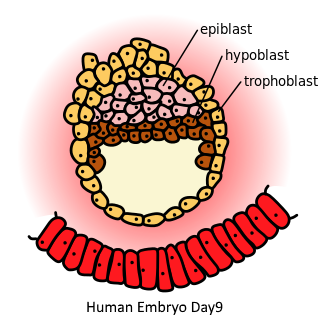
- Human embryo at day 9. Epiblast (pink) is on top of the hypoblast (brown)

Details
- Carnegie stage: 3
- Days: 8
- Precursor: Inner cell mass
- Gives rise to: Ectoderm, mesoderm, endoderm

Identifiers
- Latin: epiblastus
- TE: E5.0.2.2.1.0.1

In amniote embryonic development, the epiblast (also known as the primitive ectoderm) is one of two distinct cell layers arising from the inner cell mass in the mammalian blastocyst, or from the blastula in reptiles and birds. It drives the embryo proper through its differentiation into the three primary germ layers, ectoderm, mesoderm and endoderm, during gastrulation. The amniotic ectoderm and extraembryonic mesoderm also originate from the epiblast.

The other layer of the inner cell mass, the hypoblast, gives rise to the yolk sac. The layer surrounding the inner cell mass, the trophectoderm, gives rise to the chorion.

== Discovery of the epiblast ==
The epiblast was first discovered by Christian Heinrich Pander (1794-1865), a Baltic German biologist and embryologist. With the help of anatomist Ignaz Döllinger (1770–1841) and draftsman Eduard Joseph d'Alton (1772-1840), Pander observed thousands of chicken eggs under a microscope, and ultimately discovered and described the chicken blastoderm and its structures, including the epiblast. He published these findings in Beiträge zur Entwickelungsgeschichte des Hühnchens im Eye. Other early embryologists that studied the epiblast and blastoderm include Karl Ernst von Baer (1792-1876) and Wilhelm His (1831-1904).

== Mammals ==
In mammalian embryogenesis, differentiation and segregation of cells composing the inner cell mass of the blastocyst yields two distinct layers—the epiblast ("primitive ectoderm") and the hypoblast ("primitive endoderm"). While the cuboidal hypoblast cells delaminate ventrally, away from the embryonic pole, to line the blastocoele, the remaining cells of the inner cell mass, situated between the hypoblast and the polar trophoblast, become the epiblast and comprise columnar cells.

In the mouse, primordial germ cells are specified from epiblast cells. This specification is accompanied by extensive epigenetic reprogramming that involves global DNA demethylation, chromatin reorganization and imprint erasure leading to totipotency. The DNA base excision repair pathway has a central role in the process of genome-wide demethylation.

Upon commencement of gastrulation, the primitive streak, a visible, morphological linear band of cells, appears on the posterior epiblast and orients along the anterior-posterior embryo axis. Initiated by signals from the underlying hypoblast, formation of the primitive streak is predicated on epiblast cell migration, mediated by Nodal, from the lateral-posterior regions of the epiblast to the center midline. The primitive node is situated at the anterior end of the primitive streak and serves as the organizer for gastrulation, determining epiblast cell fate by inducing the differentiation of migrating epiblast cells during gastrulation.

During gastrulation, migrating epiblast cells undergo epithelial-mesenchymal transition in order to lose cell-cell adhesion (E-cadherin), delaminate from the epiblast layer and migrate over the dorsal surface of the epiblast then down through the primitive streak. The first wave of epiblast cells to invaginate through the primitive streak invades and displaces the hypoblast to become the embryonic endoderm. The mesoderm layer is established next as migrating epiblast cells move through the primitive streak then spread out within the space between the endoderm and remaining epiblast, which once the mesoderm layer has formed ultimately becomes the definitive ectoderm. The process of gastrulation results in a trilaminar germ disc, consisting of the ectoderm, mesoderm and endoderm layers.

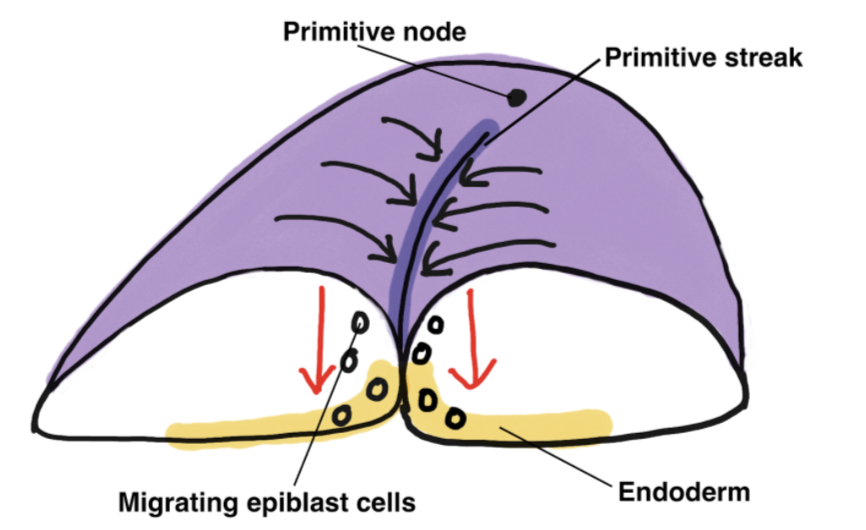
Migration of epiblast cells in the mammalian embryo

=== Epiblast diversity ===
Epiblasts exhibit diverse structure across species as a result of early embryo morphogenesis. The human epiblast assumes a disc shape, conforming to the embryonic disc morphology; whereas, the mouse epiblast develops in a cup shape within the cylindrical embryo.

During implantation of the blastocyst, both the human and mouse epiblasts form a rosette shape in a process called polarization. Polarization results from the interaction between the mammalian blastocyst and β1-integrin from the extracellular matrix, produced from the extra-embryonic tissues. At this stage, both human and mouse epiblasts consist of a pseudostratified columnar epithelium. Shortly after, the human epiblast will assume a disc shape while the amniotic cavity forms. The epiblast cells adjacent to the trophoblast are specified to become amnion cells. The mouse epiblast transitions from a rosette structure to a cup. A pro-amniotic cavity forms, surrounded by the epiblast cup fused to extraembryonic ectoderm. Mouse epiblast cells are not specified to amnion cell fate.

== Birds ==
Gastrulation occurs in the epiblast of avian embryos. A local thickening of the epiblast, known as Koller's sickle, is key in inducing the primitive streak, the structure through which gastrulation occurs.

Studies on chick embryos have shown that mediolateral cell intercalation occurs before gastrulation. The intercalation event is guided by fibroblast growth factors from the hypoblast. It is suggested that the evolution of the amniote primitive streak from the blastopore was due to the acquisition of the mediolateral intercalation event, which positions the primitive streak and acts independently of mesendoderm formation.

== Reptiles ==
Ancestors of Amniotes (mammals, birds, reptiles) underwent gastrulation primarily by an infolding of the epiblast layer (involution). Mammals and birds have evolved to rely on ingression during gastrulation where epiblast cells converge at the midline and ingress at the primitive streak. Reptile gastrulation differs slightly from birds and mammals. Reptiles exhibit bi-modal gastrulation during embryogenesis and lack a primitive streak. Bi-modal gastrulation is characterized by involution of the cells in the anterior and lateral regions of the blastopore and ingression of the cells of the blastopore plate in the posterior region. Analogies between the blastopore plate and primitive streak suggest the blastopore plate was a precursor to the mammalian and avian primitive streak.

== See also ==
- Embryogenesis
- Human embryogenesis
- Hypoblast
