= Primitive streak =

Structure in early amniote embryogenesis

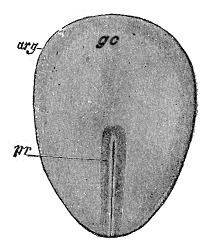
- Surface view of embryo of a rabbit. arg. Embryonic disk. pr. Primitive streak. gc. germinal crescent.

Details
- Carnegie stage: 6b
- Days: 15

Identifiers
- Latin: linea primitiva
- MeSH: D054240

The primitive streak is a structure that forms in the early embryo in amniotes. In amphibians, the equivalent structure is the blastopore. During early embryonic development, the embryonic disc becomes oval shaped, and then pear-shaped with the broad end towards the anterior, and the narrower region projected to the posterior. The primitive streak forms a longitudinal midline structure in the narrower posterior (caudal) region of the developing embryo on its dorsal side. At first formation, the primitive streak extends for half the length of the embryo. In the human embryo, this appears by stage 6, about 17 days.

The primitive streak establishes bilateral symmetry, determines the site of gastrulation, and initiates germ layer formation. To form the primitive streak, mesenchymal stem cells are arranged along the prospective midline, establishing the second embryonic axis, and the site where cells will ingress and migrate during the process of gastrulation and germ layer formation.

The primitive streak extends through this midline and creates the left–right and cranial–caudal body axes. Gastrulation involves the ingression of mesoderm progenitors and their migration to their ultimate position, where they will differentiate into the mesoderm germ layer that, together with endoderm and ectoderm germ layers, will give rise to all the tissues of the adult organism.

== Structure ==
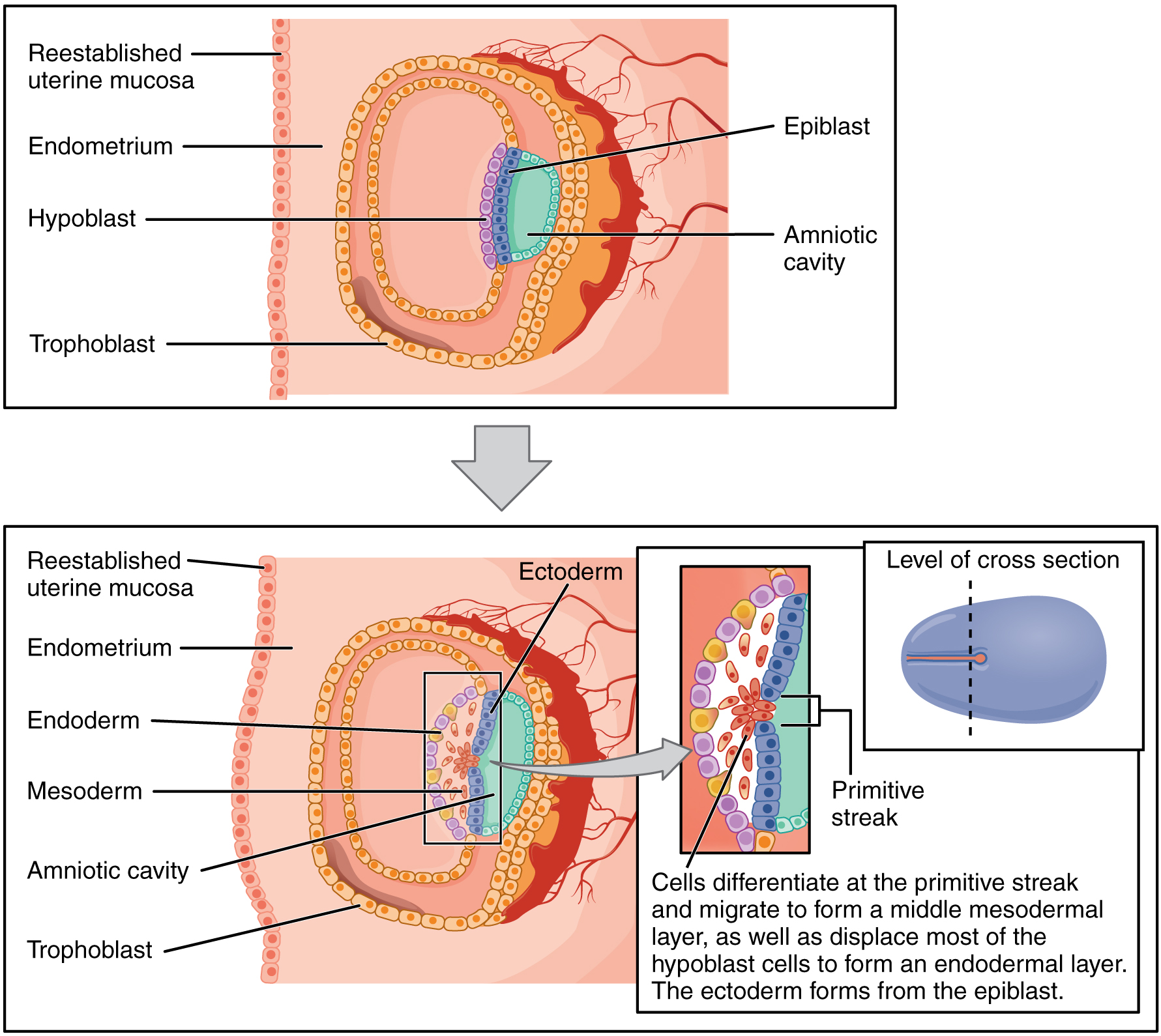
Cellular differentiation arising from the development of the primitive streak during gastrulation following implantation

The epiblast, a single epithelial layer of the bilaminar embryonic disc, is the source of all embryonic material in amniotes, and some of its cells will give rise to the primitive streak. In amphibians, the equivalent structure is the blastopore. The primitive streak forms a longitudinal midline structure in the narrower caudal (posterior) region of the developing embryo on its dorsal side. At first formation, the primitive streak extends for half the length of the embryo. In the human embryo, this appears by Carnegie stage 6, about 17 days.

Towards the cranial (anterior) end of the disc, the primitive streak expands into an area known as the primitive node which is the organizer for gastrulation. In birds, including the chick, this organizing node is called Hensen's node. In amphibians, where it was first identified, it is known as the Spemann–Mangold organizer.

In the middle of the node is a circular depression termed the primitive pit. The primitive pit extends towards the caudal end in a narrow depression in the primitive streak called the primitive groove (Latin: sulcus primitivus). The groove is created by infolding of epiblastic cells.

Following its appearance and formation of the node, pit, and groove, the streak starts to regress caudally. Around day 20 in the human embryo, the remaining parts of the streak enlarge to produce a midline caudal cell mass termed the tail bud or caudal eminence. Also at that time, the notochord develops cranially from the primitive node. By day 22, the primitive streak has regressed to between 10 and 20% of the embryo's length, and by day 26, has seemingly disappeared.

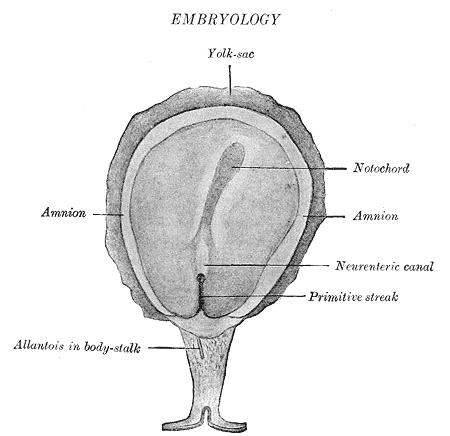
Primitive streak in relation to later developed notochord shown on black crested gibbon embryo

== Formation ==
The chick embryo as a model organism has provided much information about the formation of the primitive streak. In the chick blastula, its formation involves the coordinated movement and re-arrangement of cells in the epiblast. Two counter-rotating flows of cells meet at the posterior end, where the streak forms. There is little movement in the center of these flows, while the greatest movement is observed at the periphery of the vortices. The vortex movements likened to polonaise movement is key for the formation of the primitive streak. Cells overlaying Koller's sickle in the posterior end of the chick embryo move towards the midline, meet and change direction towards the center of the epiblast. Cells from the lateral posterior marginal zone replace those cells that left Koller's Sickle by meeting at the center of this region, changing direction and extending anteriorly. As these cells move and concentrate at the posterior end of the embryo, the streak undergoes a single- to multi-layered epithelial sheet transition that makes it a macroscopically visible structure. Several mechanisms, including active proliferation, oriented cell division, cell-cell intercalation and chemotactic cell movement, have been proposed to explain the nature of the cellular movements required to form the primitive streak.

The marginal zone of a chick embryo contains cells that will contribute to the streak. This region has a defined anterior-to-posterior gradient in its ability to induce the primitive streak, with the posterior end having the highest potential. All cells in the epiblast can respond to signals from the marginal zone, but once a given region is induced by these signals and undergoes streak formation, the remaining cells in the epiblast are no longer responsive to these inductive signals and prevent the formation of another streak.

Underlying the epiblast is the hypoblast, where the extraembryonic tissue originates. In the chick, the absence of the hypoblast results in multiple streaks, suggesting that its presence is important for regulating the formation of a single primitive streak. In mice and other mammals, this structure is known as the anterior visceral endoderm (AVE). The AVE migrates from the visceral endoderm (hypoblast). The hypoblast also plays an important role in the regulation of streak formation. Removal of the hypoblast in the chick results in correctly patterned ectopic streaks, suggesting that the hypoblast serves to inhibit formation of the primitive streak.

=== Signaling pathways ===
An intricate network of signaling pathways regulate the formation of the primitive streak.

The formation of the primitive streak in the chick, is highly regulated by a complex network of signaling pathways. Activation of various secreted factors (Vg1, Nodal, Wnt8C, FGF8 and Chordin) and transcription factors (Brachyury and Goosecoid) adjacent to the site of streak formation is required for this process.

==== Vg1 and Wnt signaling ====
Similarly, Vg1 (a transforming growth factor beta superfamily member (TGF-β)) misexpression and grafts of the posterior marginal zone in chicks can also induce ectopic streaks, but only within the marginal zone of the embryo, indicating a specific characteristic of this region in its ability to induce streak formation. Several lines of evidence point to Wnt expression as the determinant of this ability. Deletion of Wnt3 in mouse embryos results in the absence of a streak formation, similarly to the phenotype of B-catenin mutant embryos. In addition, mutating the intracellular negative regulator of Wnt signaling, Axin, and misexpression of the chick cWnt8C produces multiple streaks in mouse embryos. Localization of Wnt and components of its pathway, Lef1 and B-catenin, further supports streak-inducing role in the marginal zone. Furthermore, it is expressed as a gradient decreasing from posterior to anterior, corresponding to the streak-inducing ability of the marginal zone. Misexpression of Vg1 or Wnt1 alone failed to induce an ectopic streak in the chick, but together their misexpression resulted in ectopic streak formation, confirming that the streak-inducing ability of the posterior marginal zone could be attributed to Wnt signaling and that Vg1 and Wnt must cooperate to induce this process. Misexpression of Vg1 along with Wnt antagonists, Crescent or Dkk-1, prevents the formation of ectopic streaks, demonstrating the importance of Wnt activity in the formation of Vg1-induced ectopic streaks and hence its implication in normal primitive streak formation.

==== Nodal signaling ====
Nodal, a known mesodermal inducer of the transforming growth factor beta superfamily (TGFB family), has been implicated in streak formation. Mouse embryos mutant for Nodal fail to gastrulate and lack most mesoderm, but more than playing a role in mesoderm induction, Nodal regulates the induction and/or maintenance of the primitive streak. In the presence of hypoblast, Nodal is unable to induce ectopic streaks in the chick embryo, while its removal, induces expression of Nodal, Chordin, and Brachyury, suggesting that the hypoblast must have a certain inhibitory effect on Nodal signaling. Indeed, the multifunctional antagonist of Nodal, Wnt, and BMP signaling, Cerberus (produced in the hypoblast) and Cerberus-Short (which inhibits only Nodal), through its effect on Nodal signaling, inhibits streak formation. Eventually, the hypoblast gets displaced anteriorly by the moving endoblast, allowing streak formation at the posterior end. At the anterior end, the presence of the hypoblast and the antagonists it secretes, such as Cerberus, inhibit the expression of Nodal and hence restrict streak formation to the posterior end only. Similarly to the hypoblast in chick, the AVE in the mouse secretes two antagonists of Nodal signaling, Cerberus-like, Cerl, and Lefty1. In mouse, Cer-/-; Lefty1-/- double mutants develop multiple streaks as indicated by ectopic expression of Brachyury and can be partially rescued by the removal of one copy of the Nodal gene. In the mouse, the AVE restricts streak formation through the redundant functions of Cer1 and Lefty1, which negatively regulate Nodal signaling. The role of the mouse's AVE in ensuring the formation of a single primitive streak is evolutionarily conserved in the hypoblast of the chick.

==== FGF signaling ====
Another important pathway in modulating formation of the primitive streak is FGF, which is thought to work together with Nodal to regulate this process. Inhibition of FGF signaling through expression of a dominant negative receptor, using a FGF receptor inhibitor (SU5402) or depletion of FGF ligands, inhibit mesoderm formation and this in turn, inhibits streak formation. Furthermore, ectopic streak formation induced by Vg1 required FGF signaling.

==== BMP signaling ====
Finally, BMP signaling is also important for regulating the process of streak formation in the chick embryo. The site of streak formation is characterized by low BMP signals, while the rest of the epiblast displays high levels of BMP activation. In addition, misexpression of either BMP4 or BMP7 prevents streak formation, while the BMP inhibitor Chordin induces ectopic streak formation in the chick, suggesting that streak formation is likely to require BMP inhibition.

== Ethical implications ==
The primitive streak is an important concept in bioethics, where some experts have argued that experimentation with human embryos is permissible, but only before the primitive streak develops, generally around the fourteenth day of existence. The development of the primitive streak is taken, by such bioethicists, to signify the existence of a unique human being. In some countries, it is illegal to develop a human embryo for more than 14 days outside a woman's body.

== See also ==
- Gastruloid

== Additional images ==
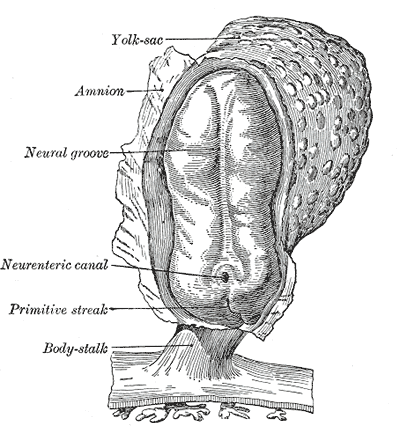
Human embryo—length, 2 mm. Dorsal view, with the amnion laid open. X 30.

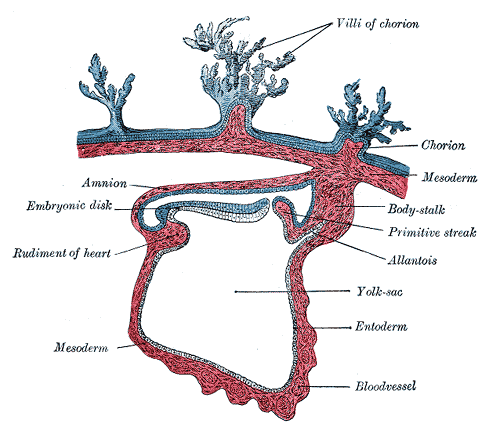
Lateral section through the mammalian blastodisc.
