= Hypoblast =

Embryonic inner cell mass tissue that forms the yolk sac and, later, chorion

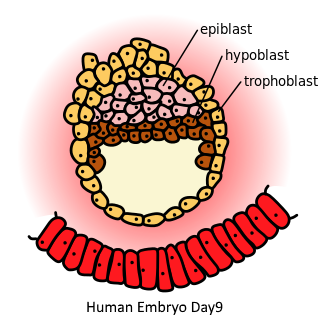
- Human embryo on day 9. Hypoblast (brown) is beneath the epiblast (pink)

Details
- Days: 8
- Precursor: Inner cell mass
- Gives rise to: Endoderm, yolk sac

Identifiers
- Latin: hypoblastus
- TE: E6.0.1.1.3.0.4

In early development, the embryo consists of a disc-shaped mass of cells sitting on top of the yolk. This cell mass often consists of an upper layer (the epiblast) and a lower layer (the hypoblast). Hypoblast cells give rise to extra-embryonic cells necessary for normal embryonic development.

In amniote embryology, the hypoblast is one of two distinct layers arising from the inner cell mass in the mammalian blastocyst, or from the blastodisc in reptiles and birds. The hypoblast gives rise to the yolk sac.

The hypoblast is a layer of cells in fish and amniote embryos. The hypoblast helps determine the embryo's body axes, and its migration determines the cell movements that accompany the formation of the primitive streak, and helps to orient the embryo, and create bilateral symmetry.

The other layer of the inner cell mass, the epiblast, differentiates into the three primary germ layers, ectoderm, mesoderm, and endoderm.

== Structure ==
The hypoblast lies beneath the epiblast and consists of small cuboidal cells. The hypoblast in fish (but not in birds and mammals) contains the precursors of both the endoderm and mesoderm. In birds and mammals, it contains precursors to the extraembryonic endoderm of the yolk sac.

In chick embryos, early cleavage forms an area opaca and an area pellucida, and the region between these is called the marginal zone. Area opaca is the blastoderm's peripheral part where the cells remain unseparated from the yolk. It is a white area that transmits light.

== Function ==
Although the hypoblast does not contribute to the embryo, it influences the orientation of the embryo. The hypoblast also inhibits primitive streak formation. The absence of hypoblast results in multiple primitive streaks in chicken embryos. The primitive endoderm derived yolk sac ensures the proper organogenesis of the fetus and the exchange of nutrients, gases, and wastes. Hypoblast cells also provide chemical signals that specify the migration of epiblast cells.

== Amniotes ==
=== Birds ===
In birds, the primitive streak formation is generated by a thickening of the epiblast called the Koller's sickle The Koller's sickle is created at the posterior edge of the area pellucida while the rest of the cells of the area pellucida remain at the surface, forming the epiblast. In chicks, the mesoderm cells don't invaginate, like in amphibians, but they migrate medially and caudally from both sides and create a midline thickening called primitive streak. The primitive streak grows rapidly in length as more presumptive mesoderm cells continue to aggregate inward. Gastrulation begins in the area pellucida next to the posterior marginal zone, as the hypoblast and primitive streak both start there. The avian embryo comes entirely from the epiblast, and the hypoblast does not contribute to any cells. The hypoblast cells form parts of the other membranes such as the yolk sac and the stalk linking the yolk mass to the endodermal digestive tube. In between the area opaca and Koller's sickle is a belt-like region called the posterior marginal zone (PMZ). The PMZ organizes the Hensen's center in amniotes.

Meanwhile, cells in more anterior regions of the epiblast delaminate and stay attached to the epiblast to form hypoblast "islands." These islands are clusters of 5–20 cells that migrate and become the primary hypoblast. The sheet of cells that grows anteriorly from Koller's sickle combines with the primary hypoblast to form the secondary hypoblast (also called the endoblast).

The resulting two-layered blastoderm (epiblast and hypoblast) is joined at the marginal zone of the area opaca, and the space between the layers forms a blastocoel-like a cavity. Cell division adds to the length produced by convergent extension. Some of the cells from the anterior portion of the epiblast contribute to the formation of Hensen's node. The Hensen's node is the organizer for gastrulation in the vertebrate embryo. Simultaneously, the secondary hypoblast (endoblast) cells continue to migrate anteriorly from the blastoderm's posterior marginal zone. The elongation of the primitive streak is coextensive with the anterior migration of these secondary hypoblast cells, and the hypoblast directs the movement of the primitive streak. The streak eventually extends to about ¾ of the length of the area pellucida.

Cells migrate to the primitive streak, and as they enter the embryo the cells separate into two layers. The deep layer joins the hypoblast along its midline, displacing the hypoblast cells to the sides. The first cells to migrate through Hensen's node are destined to become the foregut's pharyngeal endoderm. Once deep within the embryo, the endodermal cells migrate anteriorly and eventually displace the hypoblast cells, causing the hypoblast cells to be confined to a region in the area's anterior portion pellucida.

This pattern appears similar to that of amphibian embryos. Nodal activity is needed to initiate the primitive streak, and that it is the secretion of Cerberus—an antagonist of Nodal—by the primary hypoblast cells that prevent primitive streak formation. As the primary hypoblast cells move away from the PMZ, Cerberus protein is no longer present, allowing Nodal activity (and, therefore, forming the primitive streak) in the posterior epiblast. Once formed, however, the streak secretes its Nodal antagonist—the Lefty protein—which prevents further primitive streaks from forming. Eventually, the Cerberus-secreting hypoblast cells are pushed to the future anterior of the embryo, where they contribute to ensuring that neural cells in this region become forebrain rather than more posterior structures the nervous system. As the primitive streak reaches its maximum length, transcription of the Sonic hedgehog gene (Shh) becomes restricted to the embryo's left side, controlled by activin and its receptor.

=== Mammals ===
In mammalian embryogenesis, differentiation and segregation of cells in the inner cell mass of the blastocyst produces two different layers—the epiblast ("primitive ectoderm") and the hypoblast ("primitive endoderm").

The first segregation of cells within the inner cell mass forms two layers. In contact with the blastocoel, the lower layer is called the primitive endoderm, and it is homologous to the chick embryo hypoblast. While hypoblast cells delaminate ventrally, away from the embryonic pole, to line the blastocoele the remaining cells of the inner cell mass, situated between the hypoblast and the polar trophoblast, become the epiblast.

In the mouse primordial germ cells are from epiblast cells. This specification is accompanied by extensive epigenetic reprogramming that involves global DNA demethylation, chromatin reorganization, and imprint erasure which results in totipotency. The mammalian equivalent to the chick hypoblast is called the anterior visceral endoderm (AVE) and creates an anterior region by secreting antagonists of Nodal. In the mouse, (the most studied mammalian model organism for this) the hypoblast restricts Nodal activity using Cerberus and Lefty1 while birds use only Cerberus.

== Fish ==
In fish, the hypoblast is the inner layer of the thickened margin of the epibolizing blastoderm in the gastrulating fish embryo. The hypoblast in fish (but not in birds or mammals) contains the precursors of both the endoderm and mesoderm.

== Genetics ==
The signal transduction pathway, the Wnt pathway, is activated by fibroblast growth factors (FGF) produced by the hypoblast. If the hypoblast is rotated, the orientation of the primitive streak follows the rotation. If FGF signaling is activated in the epiblast margin, Wnt signaling will occur there. The orientation of the primitive streak will change as if the hypoblast had been placed there. The cell migrations that form the primitive streak appear to be regulated by FGFs from the hypoblast, which activates the Wnt planar cell polarity pathway in the epiblast. The Wnt pathway, in turn, is activated by FGFs produced by the hypoblast.
