= Chordin =

InterPro Family

CHRD domain

Identifiers
- Symbol: CHRD
- Pfam: PF07452
- InterPro: IPR010895
- SMART: SM00754
- PROSITE: PS50933
Available protein structures:
- PDB: IPR010895 PF07452 (ECOD; PDBsum)
- AlphaFold: IPR010895; PF07452

chordin

Identifiers
- Symbol: CHRD
- NCBI gene: 8646
- HGNC: 1949
- OMIM: 603475
- RefSeq: NM_003741
- UniProt: Q9H2X0

Other data
- Locus: Chr. 3 q27
Search for
- Structures: Swiss-model
- Domains: InterPro

Chordin (from Greek χορδή, string, catgut) is a protein with a prominent role in dorsal–ventral patterning during early embryonic development. In humans it is encoded for by the CHRD gene.

== Gene ==
CHRD is 23 exons long and has a length of 11.5 kb and is localized at 3q27. The THPO (thrombopoietin) gene is located in the same single cosmid clone along with the eukaryotic translation initiation factor-4-gamma gene (EIF4G1).

== Structure ==
Chordin is a 941 amino-acids long protein, whose three-dimensional transmission electron microscopy structure resembles a horseshoe. A characteristic structural feature of chordin is the presence of four cysteine-rich repeats, which are 58–75 residues long, each containing 10 cysteines with characteristic spacings. These repeats are homologous with domains in a number of extracellular matrix proteins, including von Willebrand factor. There are five named isoforms of this protein that are produced by alternative splicing.

== Function ==
Chordin dorsalizes the developing embryo by binding ventralizing TGFβ proteins such as bone morphogenetic proteins (BMP) through its four cytosine rich regions. Chordin blocks BMP signaling by preventing BMP from interacting with cell surface receptors, which inhibits the formation of epidermis and promoting the formation of neural tissue. Chordin specifically inhibits BMP-2,-4,-7. Chordin function is improved by a few co-factors that include the Twisted Gastrulation gene (Tsg) and the zinc metalloprotease. Tsg improves the ability of Chordin to become a BMP antagonist. Zinc metalloprotease functions by cleaving chordin allows for improved signaling with BMP in complexes that were inactive. This occurs by improving Chordin's substrate ability in cleavage reactions and by releasing BMP from chordin products.

== Animal studies ==
Experiments with zebrafish showed that a chordin gene mutation can lead to less neural and dorsal tissue. Target gene deletions of chordin, follistatin, and noggin in mice were shown to also have effects on neural induction, while deletion of both chordin and noggin showed more severe effects on neural development. The phenotype for this type of deletion showed almost full headlessness. This is significant because when only noggin is deficient there are mild defects but the head still forms. Noggin has been shown to have overlap at the midgastrula in its expression with chordin. Further experiments testing the role of both noggin and chordin showed that these two proteins are essential for mesodermal development and anterior pattern elaboration. However, noggin and chordin were not shown to play a significant role in the development of the anterior visceral endoderm.

Chordin mRNA in mice are expressed early on during the anterior primitive streak. In the chick embryo it is expressed in the anterior cells of Koller's sickle, which form the anterior cells of the primitive streak, a key structure through which gastrulation occurs. As the streak evolves to a node and axial mesoderm, the chordin mRNA is still expressed. This evidence suggests a patterning role of chordin during the early embryo stages. When chordin was inactivated, animals may initially appear to have normal development, but later on issues manifest in the inner and outer ear along with pharyngeal and cardiovascular abnormalities. Experiments with Xenopus embryos showed that overexpression of BMP1 and TLL1 can be used to counteract chordin's dorsalization functions. This finding suggests that the major chordin antagonist is BMP1.

In mice, chordin is expressed in the node but not in the anterior visceral endoderm. It has been found to be required for forebrain development. In developing mice that are deficient in both chordin and noggin, the head is nearly absent. Chordin is also involved in avian gastrulation and may also play a role in organogenesis.

== History ==
Chordin was originally identified in the African clawed frog (Xenopus laevis) in the laboratory of Edward M. De Robertis as a key developmental protein that dorsalizes early vertebrate embryonic tissues. It was first hypothesized that chordin plays a role in the dorsal homeobox genes in Spemann's organizer. The chordin gene was discovered through its activation following use of gsc (goosecoid) and Xnot mRNA injections. The discoverers of chordin concluded that it is expressed in embryo regions where gsc and Xnot were also expressed, which included the prechordal plate, the notochord, and the chordoneural hinge. The expression of the gene in these regions led to the name chordin. Initial functions of chordin were thought to include recruitment of neighboring cells to assist in the forming of the axis along with mediating cell interactions for organization of tail, head, and body regions.
