= Fibroblast growth factor and mesoderm formation =

This article is about the role of fibroblast growth factor signaling in mesoderm formation.

Mesoderm formation is a complex developmental process involving an intricate network of signaling pathways that coordinate their activities to ensure that a selective group of cells will eventually give rise to mesodermal tissues in the adult organism. Fibroblast growth factor contributes to this process not only by promoting mesoderm formation, but also by inhibiting endodermal development.

== Introduction ==
During early vertebrate development, the stage is set for the specification of the three germ layers : endoderm, mesoderm and ectoderm, which will give rise to the adult organism. The mesoderm will eventually differentiate into numerous tissues including muscles and blood. This process requires the precise integration of a variety of signaling pathways such as the transforming growth factor type β (TGFβ), fibroblast growth factor (FGF), bone morphogenetic protein (BMP), and Wnt, to achieve the induction, specification, formation and differentiation of the mesoderm layer within a given time and space.

== Network of signaling pathways ==
Members of the TGF-β superfamily, Activin and Nodal, are essential for mesodermal induction, while FGF and Wnt are in charge of its maintenance and BMP is responsible for its patterning. These pathways, in turn, depend on each other. For example, in Xenopus, disruption of FGF signaling results in the inhibition of the Nodal-dependent induction and formation of trunk and tail mesoderm, demonstrating that TGF-β dependent mesodermal induction is itself dependent on FGF signaling.

== FGF signaling ==
During the blastula and gastrula stages, vegetal cells (the presumptive endoderm), release signals to marginal zone cells resulting in the induction and patterning of the mesoderm. One of these signals, FGF, achieves this through the regulation of T box transcription factors, a strategy which is shared among Xenopus, mouse and zebrafish. Upon FGF binding to its receptor, FGFR, the receptor pair dimerizes and is transphosphorylated, enabling it to recruit proteins that activate Ras and Raf. This is followed by the subsequent phosphorylation of MEK and MAPK. MAPK can then enter into the nucleus and activate target transcription factors.

== Regulation of T box transcription factors ==
In particular, three T box transcription factors, Brachyury (frogs) or No tail (fish), VegT (frog) or Spadetail (fish), and Tbx6 (fish and frogs) are important FGF targets that play a key role in mesoderm formation. In Xenopus, zebrafish and mouse, Brachyury (bra), is required for posterior formation. FGF is necessary for the initial localization of Xbra to the dorsal side of the embryo in the marginal zone as well as for establishing and maintaining proper expression of the transcript. Disruption of FGF signaling with an FGFR inhibitor, SU5402, results in loss of Xbra expression in embryos. FGF could activate Xbra expression through Ets2, a FGF target transcription factor that binds to an FGF-responsive element of the upstream sequence.

== Feedback loop ==
Activation of FGF by two ligands that function together, FGF4 and FGF8 in Xenopus and FGF8 and FGF24 in zebrafish, is necessary for mesoderm formation. Both FGF signaling and Xbra expression are maintained through a feedback loop in which upon FGF activation, Xbra expression is turned on and Xbra then directly activates eFGF, a FGF family member. By keeping the FGF signal active, this feedback loop contributes to the function of Fgf4 in paraxial mesoderm specification. Inhibition of FGFR results in a significant reduction of both Xbra and Fgf4 expression. Although it is unlikely that Fgf8 is part of the feedback loop, it contributes to mesoderm formation by activating Fgf4.

== Other components and functions ==
Furthermore, inhibition of other components of the FGF pathway, including Ras, Raf and the transcription factor Ets2, disrupts mesodermal formation, while their over-expression induces mesodermal markers. In addition to promoting mesodermal formation, FGF can also prevent endodermal development. In zebrafish, FGF activity can down-regulate Casanova, a Nodal transcription factor and thereby prevent its endodermal development function.

== Regulation of VegT ==
Another key player in mesoderm formation is VegT, a maternally and zygotically expressed transcription inducer localized in the vegetal hemisphere. In Xenopus, VegT activates transcription of Nodal-related genes (Xnr) genes, Activin and other mesodermal transcripts, which are responsible for initiating mesodermal formation. Using dominant negative Activin receptors in Xenopus animal caps, it has been shown that FGF signaling is crucial for mesoderm formation through the activation of this and other TGFβ family members, and this process is mediated by the VegT-dependent transcription activation.

The mesodermal induction properties of VegT are dose-dependent, such that in Xenopus animal cap explants, high doses induces dorsal mesoderm, while lower doses result in ventral mesoderm. Most importantly, VegT plays a significant role in Xbra expression, and this is dependent on FGF signaling. In Xenopus, disruption of FGF signaling, inhibits the transcription-inducing activity of VegT and Xbra expression, even at the doses where VegT is known to robustly induce Xbra expression. This demonstrates that VegT induction of Xbra and its subsequent function in mesoderm formation is dependent on FGF signaling.
