= Mesenchyme =

Type of animal embryonic connective tissue

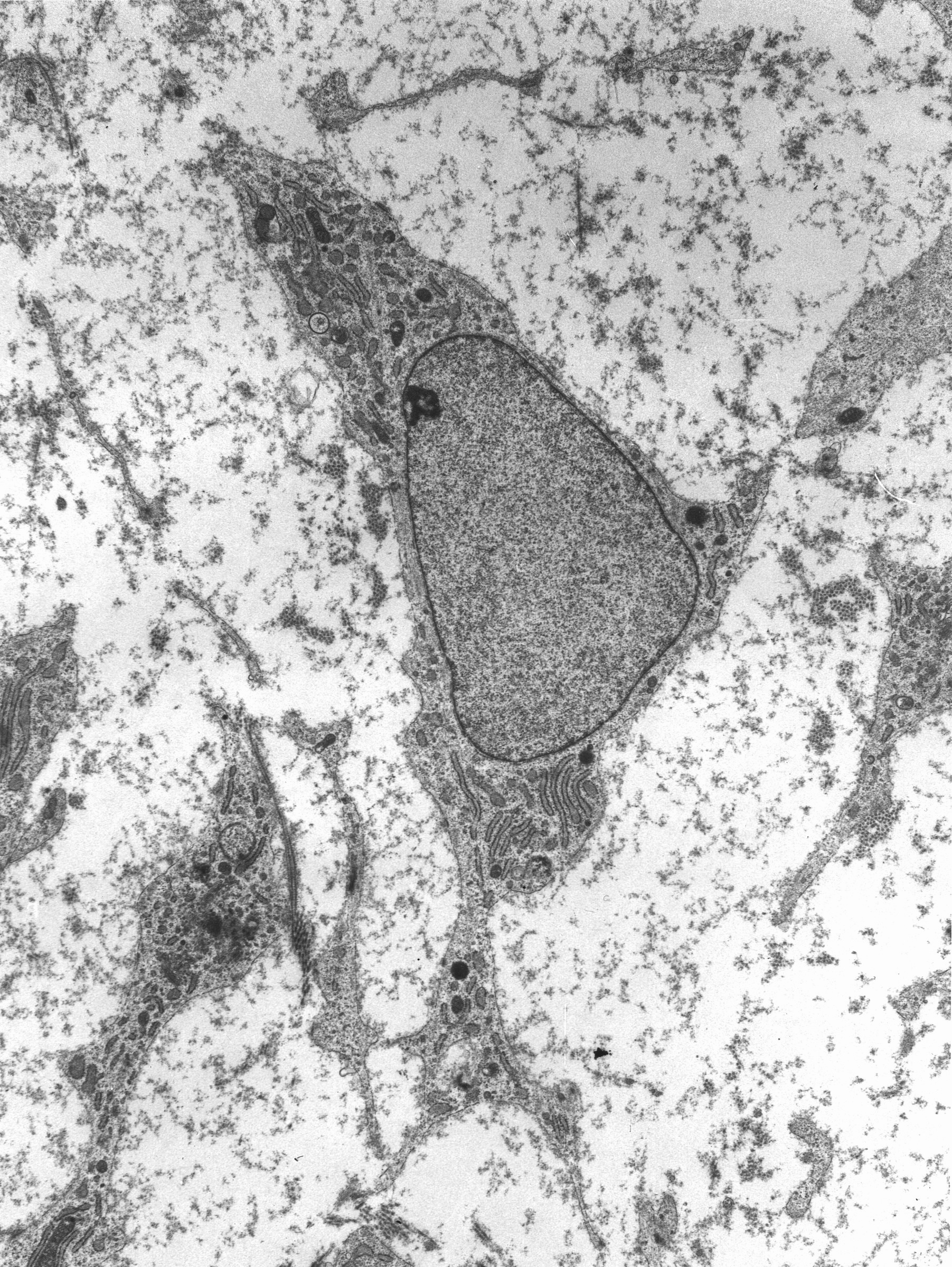
- Transmission electron micrograph of mesenchyme displaying the ultrastructure of a typical cell and matrix.

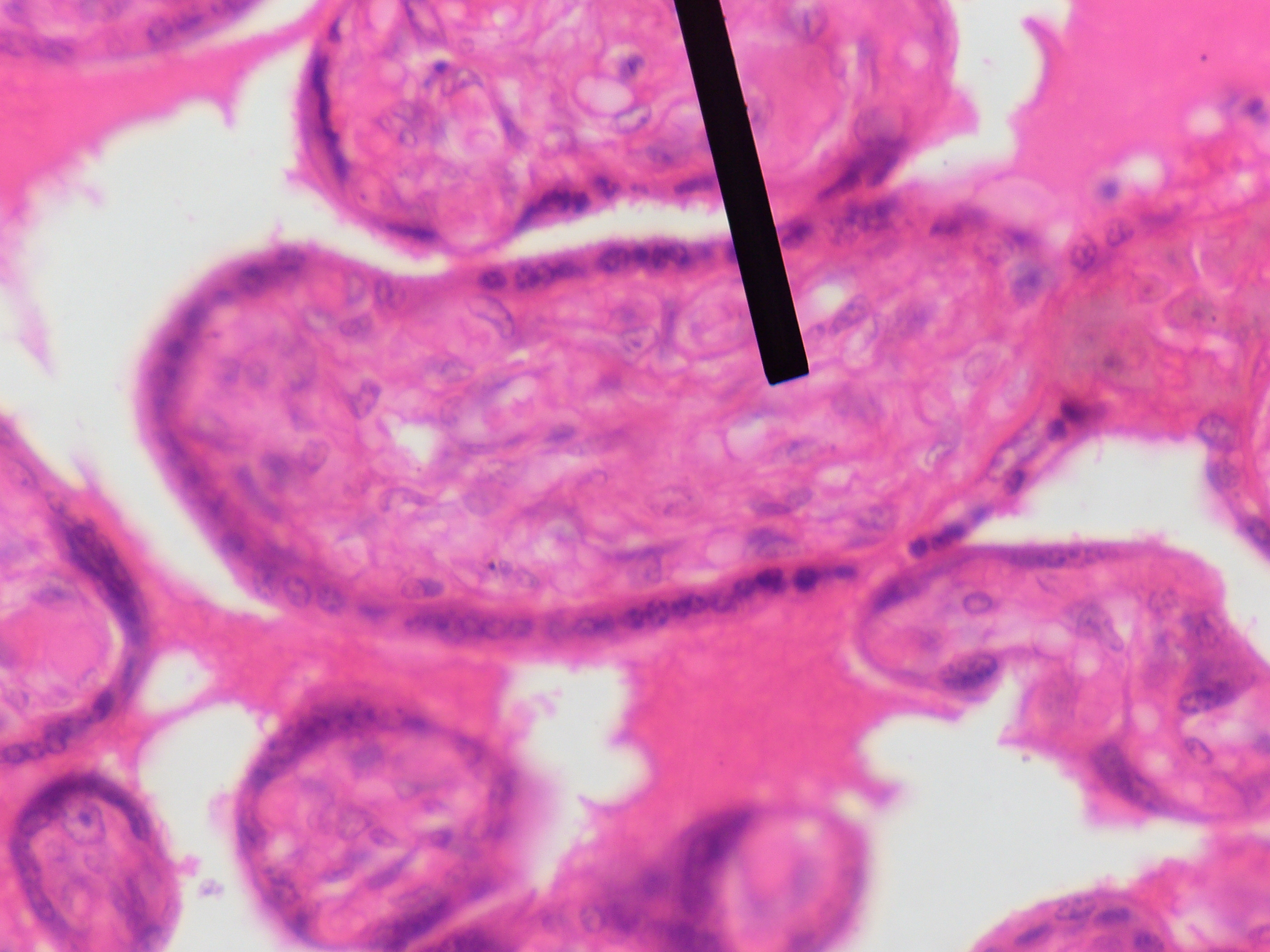
- Mesenchyme (pointer) stained with H&E

Details
- Carnegie stage: 6b
- Precursor: Lateral mesoderm

Identifiers
- TE: E5.16.4.0.3.0.18

Mesenchyme (/ˈmɛsənkaɪm ˈmiːzən-/) is a type of loosely organized animal embryonic connective tissue of undifferentiated cells that give rise to many tissues, such as skin, blood, or bone. The interactions between mesenchyme and epithelium help to form nearly every organ in the developing embryo.

== Vertebrates ==
=== Structure ===
Mesenchyme is characterized morphologically by a prominent ground substance matrix containing a loose aggregate of reticular fibers and unspecialized mesenchymal stem cells. Mesenchymal cells can migrate easily (in contrast to epithelial cells, which lack mobility, are organized into closely adherent sheets, and are polarized in an apical-basal orientation).

=== Development ===
The mesenchyme originates from the mesoderm. From the mesoderm, the mesenchyme appears as an embryologically primitive "soup". This "soup" exists as a combination of the mesenchymal cells plus serous fluid plus the many different tissue proteins. Serous fluid is typically stocked with the many serous elements, such as sodium and chloride. The mesenchyme develops into the tissues of the lymphatic and circulatory systems, as well as the musculoskeletal system. This latter system is characterized as connective tissues throughout the body, such as bone, and cartilage. A malignant cancer of mesenchymal cells is a type of sarcoma.

==== Epithelial to mesenchymal transition ====
The first emergence of mesenchyme occurs during gastrulation from the epithelial–mesenchymal transition (EMT) process. This transition occurs through the loss of epithelial cadherin, tight junctions, and adherens junctions on the cell membranes of epithelial cells. The surface molecules undergo endocytosis and the microtubule cytoskeleton loses shape, enabling mesenchyme to migrate along the extracellular matrix (ECM). Epithelial–mesenchymal transition occurs in embryonic cells that require migration through or over tissue, and can be followed with a mesenchymal–epithelial transition to produce secondary epithelial tissues. Embryonic mesenchymal cells express protein S100-A4 (S100A4), also known as fibroblast-specific protein, which is indicative of their shared properties with the migratory adult fibroblasts, and c-Fos, an oncogene associated with the down-regulation of epithelial cadherin. Formation of both the primitive streak and mesenchymal tissue depend on the Wnt/β-catenin pathway. Specific markers of mesenchymal tissue include the additional expression of ECM factors such as fibronectin and vitronectin.

==== Implantation ====
The first cells of the embryo to undergo EMT and form mesenchyme are the extra-embryonic cells of the trophectoderm. These migrate from the body of the blastocyst into the endometrial layer of the uterus in order to contribute to the formation of the anchored placenta.

==== Primary mesenchyme ====
Primary mesenchyme is the first embryonic mesenchymal tissue to emerge, and it is produced from EMT in epiblast cells. In the epiblast, it is induced by the primitive streak through Wnt signaling, and produces endoderm and mesoderm from a transitory tissue called mesendoderm during the process of gastrulation.

The formation of primary mesenchyme depends on the expression of WNT3. Other deficiencies in signaling pathways, such as in Nodal (a TGF-beta protein), will lead to defective mesoderm formation.

The tissue layers formed from the primitive streak invaginate together into the embryo and the induced mesenchymal stem cells will ingress and form the mesoderm. Mesodermal tissue will continue to differentiate and/or migrate throughout the embryo to ultimately form most connective tissue layers of the body.

==== Neural mesenchyme ====
Embryological mesenchyme is particularly transitory and soon differentiates after migration. Neural mesenchyme forms soon after primary mesenchyme formation.

The interaction with ectoderm and somite-forming morphogenic factors cause some primary mesenchyme to form neural mesenchyme, or paraxial mesoderm, and contribute to somite formation. Neural mesenchyme soon undergoes a mesenchymal–epithelial transition under the influence of WNT6 produced by ectoderm to form somites. These structures will undergo a secondary EMT as the somite tissue migrates later in development to form structural connective tissue such as cartilage and skeletal muscle.

Neural crest cells (NCCs) form from neuroectoderm, instead of the primary mesenchyme, from morphogenic signals of the neural crest. The EMT occurs as a result of Wnt signaling, the influence of Sox genes and the loss of E-cadherin from the cell surface. NCCs additionally require the repression of N-cadherin, and neural cell adhesion molecule. NCCs ingress into the embryo from the epithelial neuroectodermal layer and migrate throughout the body in order form multiple peripheral nervous system (PNS) cells and melanocytes. Migration of NCCs is primarily induced by BMP signaling and its inhibitor, Noggin.

== Invertebrates ==
In some invertebrates, such as Porifera, Cnidaria, Ctenophora, and some triploblasts (namely the acoelomates), the term "mesenchyme" refers to a more-or-less solid but loosely organized tissue that consists of a gel matrix (the mesoglea) with various cellular and fibrous inclusions, located between the epidermis and the gastrodermis (non-triploblast animals usually are considered to lack "connective" tissue). In some cases, the mesoglea is noncellular.

- In sponges, the mesenchyme is called mesohyl.
- In diploblasts (Cnidaria and Ctenophora), the mesenchyme is fully ectodermally derived. This kind of mesenchyme is called ectomesodermal, and is not considered true mesoderm.
- In triploblastic acoelomates (such as flatworms), the term parenchyma is sometimes used for the middle (mesenchymal) layer, in which the dense layer includes tissues derived from both ectoderm, and endomesoderm (true mesoderm, derived from entoderm).

When cellular material is sparse or densely packed, as in cnidarians, the mesenchyme may sometimes be called collenchyma, or parenchyma in flatworms. When no cellular material is present as in Hydrozoa, the layer is properly called mesoglea.

In some colonial cnidarians, the mesenchyme is perforated by gastrovascular channels continuous among colony members. This entire matrix of common basal material is called coenenchyme.
