= Frzb =

Protein found in humans

FRZB

Identifiers
- Aliases: FRZB, FRE, FRITZ, FRP-3, FRZB-1, FRZB-PEN, FRZB1, FZRB, OS1, SFRP3, SRFP3, hFIZ, frizzled-related protein, frizzled related protein
- External IDs: OMIM: 605083; MGI: 892032; GeneCards: FRZB

Gene location (Human)
| Chr. | Chromosome 2 (human) |
| Band | 2q32.1 | Start | 182,833,275 bp |
| Band | 2q32.1 | End | 182,866,637 bp |

Gene location (Mouse)
| Chr. | Chromosome 2 (mouse) |
| Band | 2 C3|2 48.13 cM | Start | 80,242,314 bp |
| Band | 2 C3|2 48.13 cM | End | 80,277,969 bp |
RNA expression pattern
| Bgee | Human / Mouse (ortholog); Top expressed in: retinal pigment epithelium; right coronary artery; cartilage tissue; ascending aorta; Descending thoracic aorta; urethra; Achilles tendon; popliteal artery; tibial arteries; Epithelium of choroid plexus / Top expressed in: lower jaw; upper jaw; intercostal muscle; islet of Langerhans; maxillary prominence; lamina propria of urethra; mandibular prominence; incisor; mandible; genital tubercle; More reference expression data |
| BioGPS | n/a |
Gene ontology
| Molecular function | G protein-coupled receptor activity; Wnt-protein binding; Wnt-activated receptor activity; protein binding |
| Cellular component | membrane; extracellular region; extracellular space; integral component of membrane; cytoplasm |
| Biological process | skeletal system development; cell differentiation; negative regulation of cartilage development; negative regulation of Wnt signaling pathway; neural crest cell differentiation; Wnt signaling pathway; negative regulation of hepatocyte differentiation; somite development; multicellular organism development; cochlea morphogenesis; negative regulation of cell growth; inner ear morphogenesis; positive regulation of apoptotic process; positive regulation of fat cell differentiation; negative regulation of canonical Wnt signaling pathway; negative regulation of cell development; convergent extension involved in organogenesis; negative regulation of cell population proliferation; G protein-coupled receptor signaling pathway; non-canonical Wnt signaling pathway; canonical Wnt signaling pathway |
Sources:Amigo / QuickGO
Orthologs
| Databases | NCBI: entry; OMA: entry |
| Species | Human | Mouse |
| Entrez | 2487 | 20378 |
| Ensembl | ENSG00000162998 | ENSMUSG00000027004 |
| UniProt | Q92765 | P97401 |
| RefSeq (mRNA) | NM_001463 | NM_011356 |
| RefSeq (protein) | NP_001454; NP_001454.2 | NP_035486 |
| Location (UCSC) | Chr 2: 182.83 – 182.87 Mb | Chr 2: 80.24 – 80.28 Mb |
| PubMed search |
- Wikidata
| View/Edit Human | View/Edit Mouse |

Frzb (pronounced like the toy frisbee) is a Wnt-binding protein especially important in embryonic development. It is a competitor for the cell-surface G-protein receptor Frizzled.

Frizzled is a tissue polarity gene in Drosophila melanogaster and encodes integral proteins that function as cell-surface receptors for Wnts called serpentine receptors. The integral membrane proteins contain a cysteine-rich domain thought to be the Wnt binding domain in extracellular region. The signals are initiated at the 7 transmembrane domain and transmitted through receptor coupling to G-proteins.

This protein is expressed in chondrocytes making it important in skeletal development in the embryo and fetus. Frzb is localized in the extracellular plasma membrane. Unlike frizzled, frzb lacks the 7 transmembrane domains normally found in G-protein-coupled receptors. It is still considered a homolog of frizzled because it contains a Cysteine Rich Domain (CRD), and because of its intracellular C-terminus which is crucial for signaling. The CRD is highly conserved in diverse proteins, such as receptor tyrosine kinases and functions as a ligand binding domain. The C-terminal is a carboxyl terminus located intracellularly and is required for canonical signaling.

The serpentine receptors (frzb) couple binds to ligand (Wnt protein) and activates G-proteins. A signal transduction cascade results in the secretion of first and second group antagonists. First group antagonists are composed of secreted Frizzled Related protein family (Sfrp) and Wnt inhibitory factor (Wif). Both Srfp and Wif bind directly to Wnt proteins blocking activation of the receptor. Second group of antagonists contains a class of Wnt inhibitory proteins known as Frizzled Receptor-like Proteins (FRPs). FRPs bind to the LRP (low-density-lipoprotein-related protein) co-receptors blocking activation of the Wnt signaling pathway.

One such pathway that involves Frizzled (Fz) family is the Wnt/β-Catenin (β-Cat) signaling. β-Cat is an intracellular signal that is held in check by axin. In this pathway, the activation of Wnt receptors can be transduced by the canonical pathway via a series of phosphorylation steps leading to stabilization and nuclear import of β-Cat into the nucleus where β-Cat associates with T-cell factor (TCF), a DNA-binding protein family. The β-Cat and TCF complex activates target genes of the Wnt pathway. In the absence of Wnt, β-Catenin is phosphorylated by complex containing GSK3 (glycogen synthase kinase 3) which targets β-Cat for proteosomal degradation. In the nucleus, members of the T-cell factor (TCF) family of DNA-binding proteins repress Wnt targets along with co-repressors such as Groucho (Gro).

If Wnt is present it binds to Fz-LRP receptors causing axin to bind to intracellular domain of LRP and Fz. Dishevelled (Dvl) is a protein required for Wnt-dependent inhibition complex. The combination of LRP-axin induces Dvl phosphorylation (P) which blocks the APC-axin-GSK3 complex from phosphorylating β-Cat. The accumulated β-Cat then enters the nucleus and converts TCF into a transcriptional activator.

Defects in Frzb are associated with female-specific osteoarthritis (OA) susceptibility which is the most prevalent form of arthritis and common cause of disability.

https://web.archive.org/web/20070930043451/http://jcs.biologists.org/content/vol119/issue3/images/large/JCS02826F1.jpeg

Frzb (known as Frzb1 or Sfrp3, Secreted Frizzled Related Protein 3) was initially identified as a chondrogenic factor during bone morphogenesis, and was described as a novel marker of the neural crest-derived mesenchymal cells that contribute to dental follicle formation, the future periodontium.

== See also ==
- Signal transduction
- Morphogenesis
- Developmental biology
- Embryogenesis
- Cancer
- Catenin
