= Hilde Mangold =

German biologist (1898–1924)

- Born: 20 October 1898; Gotha, Germany
- Died: 4 September 1924 (aged 25); Freiburg, Germany
- Citizenship: German
- Education: University of Freiburg
- Known for: Embryonic induction and the Organiser
- Scientific career
- Fields: Embryology
- Thesis: Induction of Embryonic Primordia by Implantation of Organizers from a Different Species (1924)
- Doctoral advisor: Hans Spemann

Hilde Mangold (20 October 1898 – 4 September 1924) (née Proescholdt) was a German embryologist who was best known for her 1923 dissertation which was the foundation for her mentor, Hans Spemann's, 1935 Nobel Prize in Physiology or Medicine for the discovery of the embryonic organizer, "one of the very few doctoral theses in biology that have directly resulted in the awarding of a Nobel Prize". The general effect she demonstrated is known as embryonic induction, that is, the capacity of some cells to direct the developmental trajectory of other cells, one of the first steps towards cloning. Induction remains a fundamental concept and area of ongoing research in the field.

== Biography ==
Hilde Proescholdt was born in Gotha, Thuringia, a province in central-eastern Germany on October 20, 1898. She was the middle daughter of soap factory owner Ernest Proescholdt and his wife Gertrude. She attended the University of Jena in Germany for two semesters in 1918 and 1919 and then transferred to the University of Frankfurt in Germany where she also spent two semesters. It was here that she saw a lecture by the renowned embryologist Hans Spemann on experimental embryology.

This lecture inspired her to pursue her education in this field. After Frankfurt, she attended the Zoological Institute in Freiburg. It was here that she met and married her husband, Otto Mangold, who was Spemann's chief assistant (and, incidentally, a supporter of the Nazi Party). Under Spemann's direction, she completed her 1923 dissertation, entitled "Induction of Embryonic Primordia by Implantation of Organizers from a Different Species" (German: "Über Induktion von Embryonalanlagen durch Implantation artfremder Organisatoren").

After earning her PhD in zoology, Hilde moved with her husband and infant son, Christian, to Berlin. Shortly after the move, Hilde died from severe burns as a result of a gas heater explosion in her Berlin home. She never lived to see the publication of her thesis results. Her son died in World War II.

== Key experiments ==
Mangold performed very delicate transplantation experiments with embryos (a feat even more impressive before the discovery of antibiotics to prevent infection after surgery). She demonstrated that tissue from the dorsal lip of the blastopore grafted into a host embryo can induce the formation of an extra body axis, creating conjoined twins. Crucially, by using two species of newt with different skin colors for host and donor, she showed that the amphibian organizer did not form the extra axis by itself, but recruited host tissue to form the twin (although the full implications of this result were not understood until a year after her death). This was the basis of the discovery of the "organizer", which is responsible for gastrulation.

== See also ==
- Developmental biology
- Embryogenesis
- Theodor Boveri
- August Weismann
