= Prechordal plate =

Anatomical structure of the embryo

In the development of vertebrate animals, the prechordal plate is a "uniquely thickened portion" of the mesendoderm that is in contact with ectoderm immediately rostral to the cephalic tip of the notochord. It is the most likely origin of the rostral cranial mesoderm.

STAGE 6

The prechordal plate is a thickening of the endoderm at the cranial end of the primitive streak seen in Embryo Beneke by Hill J.P., Florian J (1963)

STAGE 7

The prechordal plate is described as a median mass of cells, located at the anterior end of the notochord, which appears in early embryos as an integral part of the roof of the foregut. e.g. Embryos Bi 24 and Manchester 1285. and Gilbert P.W., (1957)

STAGE 8

O'Rahilly R., Müller F. (1987) present a detailed discussion of the term 'prechordal plate' and its relation to the 'prochordal plate'. These essentially synonymous terms refer to the horseshoe-shaped band of thickened endoderm rostral to the notochord but not quite reaching the rostral extremity of the embryo. It reaches its maximum state of development at about this stage and contributes mesodermal type cells to the surrounding tissue. Cells derived from the prechordal plate become incorporated into the cephalic mesenchyme ( including the 'premandibular' condensation described by Gilbert P.W., (1957) and some of the foregut endoderm.

STAGE 9

The prechordal plate is continuous rostrally with the cardiac mesenchyme and it is rotated caudo-ventrally as the cranial flexure develops and the head moves ventrally.

STAGE 10

In the 10 somite embryo, Carnegie No. 5074, the prechordal plate is continuous posteriorly with the notochord, and is made up of about 35-40 cells. The prechordal mesenchyme proliferates laterally over the junction of the dorsal aorta and first aortic arch on each side. Gilbert P.W., (1957)

STAGE 11

The prechordal plate contributes largely to the premandibular condensation and the mesenchyme of the heart such that little is seen in the median plane at this stage. Müller F., O'Rahilly R., (1986)

STAGE 12

The premandibular condensation is situated bilaterally at the rostral end of the notochord, bridged in the median plane by mesenchymal cells also of prechordal origin. e.g. The 26 somite embryo, Carnegie No. 4736. Gilbert P.W., (1957)

STAGE 13

The premandibular condensation has formed from the prechordal plate mesoderm, the bilateral masses remain connected by a bridge of mesenchyme that is thought to later contribute to the meninges. Müller F., O'Rahilly R., (1986)
