= Mammalian embryogenesis =

Process of embryonic development in mammals

Mammalian embryogenesis is the process of cell division and cellular differentiation during early prenatal development which leads to the development of a mammalian embryo.

== Difference from embryogenesis of lower chordates ==
Due to the fact that placental mammals and marsupials nourish their developing embryos via the placenta, the ovum in these species does not contain significant amounts of yolk, and the yolk sac in the embryo is relatively small in size, in comparison with both the size of the embryo itself and the size of yolk sac in embryos of comparable developmental age from lower chordates. The fact that an embryo in both placental mammals and marsupials undergoes the process of implantation, and forms the chorion with its chorionic villi, and later the placenta and umbilical cord, is also a difference from lower chordates.

The difference between a mammalian embryo and an embryo of a lower chordate animal is evident starting from blastula stage. Due to that fact, the developing mammalian embryo at this stage is called a blastocyst, not a blastula, which is more generic term.

There are also several other differences from embryogenesis in lower chordates. One such difference is that in mammalian embryos development of the central nervous system and especially the brain tends to begin at earlier stages of embryonic development and to yield more structurally advanced brain at each stage, in comparison with lower chordates. The evolutionary reason for such a change likely was that the advanced and structurally complex brain, characteristic of mammals, requires more time to develop, but the maximum time spent in utero is limited by other factors, such as relative size of the final fetus to the mother (ability of the fetus to pass mother's genital tract to be born), limited resources for the mother to nourish herself and her fetus, etc. Thus, to develop such a complex and advanced brain in the end, the mammalian embryo needed to start this process earlier and to perform it faster.

Another difference is that during the development of embryonic genitourinary tract, in case of female embryo of placental and marsupial mammals, the uterus is formed, a structure that neither monotremata nor lower chordates have. In every case, including monotremata embryos, the milk glands also develop.

== Difference from human embryogenesis ==
Most mammals develop similarly to humans; during the earliest stages of development, the embryo is largely indistinguishable from another mammal. However, there are phenomena found in human beings not found in all other mammals, as well as phenomena occurring in other mammals, but not in humans.

=== Humans ===
Mammals do not have the same human chorionic gonadotropin released from their embryo.

=== Non-human mammals ===
The anatomy of the area surrounding an embryo or fetus is different in litter-bearing animals compared to humans: each unborn animal is surrounded by placental tissue and is lodged along one of two long uterine horns rather than in the center of the pear-shaped uterus found in a human female.

== See also ==
- Embryogenesis
- Mammalian Parthenogenesis
- Drosophila embryogenesis
- Plant embryogenesis
- Developmental biology
- Blastomere
- Morula
- Cdx2
