= Hans Spemann =

German embryologist (1869–1941)

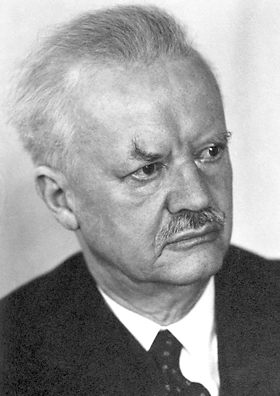
- Born: 27 June 1869; Stuttgart, Kingdom of Württemberg
- Died: 9 September 1941 (aged 72); Freiburg, Germany
- Known for: Embryonic induction and the Organiser
- Awards: Nobel Prize in Physiology or Medicine (1935)
- Scientific career
- Fields: Embryology
- Doctoral advisor: Theodor Boveri

Hans Spemann (German: [ˈhans ˈʃpeeːˌman]; 27 June 1869 – 9 September 1941) was a German embryologist who was awarded a Nobel Prize in Physiology or Medicine in 1935 for his student Hilde Mangold's discovery of the effect now known as embryonic induction, an influence, exercised by various parts of the embryo, that directs the development of groups of cells into particular tissues and organs, one of the first steps towards cloning. Spemann added his name as an author to Hilde Mangold's dissertation (although she objected) and won a Nobel Prize for her work.

== Biography ==
Hans Spemann was born in Stuttgart, the eldest son of publisher Wilhelm Spemann and his wife Lisinka, née Hoffman. After he left school in 1888, he spent a year in his father's business, then, from 1889 to 1890, he did military service in the Kassel Hussars followed by a short time as a bookseller in Hamburg. In 1891, he entered Heidelberg University where he studied medicine, taking his preliminary examination in 1893. There, he met the biologist and psychologist Gustav Wolff who had begun experiments on the embryological developments of newts and shown that, if the lens of a developing newt's eye is removed, it regenerates.

In 1892, Spemann married Klara Binder with whom he had a daughter (Margaret) and three sons (Fritz, Rudolph, Ulrich). From 1893 to 1894, he moved to the Ludwig-Maximilians-Universität München for clinical training but decided, rather than becoming a clinician, to move to the Zoological Institute at the University of Würzburg, where he remained as a lecturer until 1908. His degree in zoology, botany, and physics, awarded in 1895, followed study under Theodor Boveri, Julius von Sachs and Wilhelm Röntgen. He was a Protestant.

For his Ph.D. thesis under Boveri, Spemann studied cell lineage in the parasitic worm Strongylus paradoxus, for his teaching diploma, the development of the middle ear in the frog. Spemann advocated a holistic approach to biology.

== Experiments in ontogeny ==
During the winter of 1896, while quarantined in a sanitarium recovering from tuberculosis, Spemann read August Weismann's book The Germ Plasm: A Theory of Heredity. He wrote in his autobiography: "I found here a theory of heredity and development elaborated with uncommon perspicacity to its ultimate consequences..... This stimulated experimental work of my own".

Results in embryology had been contradictory: in 1888, Wilhelm Roux, who had introduced the experimental manipulation of the embryo to discover the rules of development, performed a series of experiments in which he inserted a hot needle into one of two blastomeres to kill it. He then observed how the remaining blastomere developed, and found that it became a half embryo. In 1892, Hans Driesch performed similar experiments on sea urchin embryos, but instead of killing one of the two blastomeres he put many embryos in a tube and shook it to separate the cells. He reported that, contrary to Roux's findings, he ended up with completely formed but smaller embryos. The reason for this discrepancy has been widely attributed to Driesch separating the two blastomeres completely rather than just killing one as Roux had done. Others, including Thomas Hunt Morgan and Oscar Hertwig, attempted to separate the two cells, for the matter was of great importance, particularly to the arguments between proponents of epigenesis and preformation, but satisfactory results could not be achieved.

As a master of micro-surgical technique, beginning with his continuing work on the amphibian eye, Spemann's papers in the early years of the 20th century on this vexed question were to be a great contribution to the development of experimental morphogenesis, causing him to be hailed in some quarters as the true founder of microsurgery. He succeeded in dividing the cells with a noose of baby hair. Spemann found that one half could indeed form a whole embryo, but observed that the plane of division was crucial. This dispatched the theory of preformation and gave some support to the concept of a morphogenetic field, a concept of which Spemann learned from Paul Alfred Weiss.

== Induction and organizers ==
Spemann was appointed Professor of Zoology and Comparative Anatomy at Rostock in 1908 and, in 1914, associate director of the Kaiser Wilhelm Institute of Biology at Dahlem, Berlin. Here he undertook the experiments that would make him famous. Drawing upon the recent work of Warren H. Lewis and Ethel Browne Harvey, he turned his skills to the gastrula, grafting a "field" of cells (the Primitive knot) from one embryo onto another.

The experiments, performed by Hilde Proescholdt (later Mangold), a Ph.D. candidate in Spemann's laboratory in Freiburg, took place over several years and were published in full only in 1924. They described an area in the embryo, the portions of which, upon transplantation into a second embryo, organized or "induced" secondary embryonic primordia regardless of location. Spemann called these areas "organiser centres" or "organisers". Later he showed that different parts of the organiser centre produce different parts of the embryo.

Despite his modern reputation, Spemann continued to entertain neo-vitalist "field" analyses similar to those of Hans Driesch, Gurwitsch and Harold Saxton Burr. However, the follow-up work of Johannes Holtfreter, Dorothy M. Needham and Joseph Needham, Conrad Waddington and others showed that organizers killed by boiling, fixing or freezing were also capable of causing induction. The conclusion was that the actual controllers were inert molecules, though little headway was made until the end of the 20th century in discovering how signalling took place.

From 1919, Spemann was Professor of Zoology at the University of Freiburg-im-Breisgau, where he continued his line of enquiry until, in 1937, he was relieved of his post to be replaced by one of his first students, Otto Mangold. He was elected an International Member of the United States National Academy of Sciences in 1925. In 1928, he was the first to perform somatic cell nuclear transfer using amphibian embryos – one of the first moves towards cloning. He was elected an International Honorary Member of the American Academy of Arts and Sciences in 1933. He was awarded the Nobel Prize in 1935. He was elected an International Member of the American Philosophical Society in 1937. His theory of embryonic induction by organisers is described in his book Embryonic Development and Induction (1938). He died of heart failure on 12 September 1941. He never lost his love of classical literature and, throughout his life, organized evening gatherings of friends to discuss art, literature, and philosophy.

== Support of Nazism ==
The commemoration of the 1923 death of Albert Leo Schlageter in Freiburg attracted particular attention. Hans Spemann suspended classes on June 6 and, with the deans in full regalia, went in a joint funeral procession with representatives of the student body and corporations to the train station, where they met with delegations of officers from Schlageter's former regiment and the German Officers' Association and students from Schlageter's former high school. Upon the train's arrival, Spemann laid two wreaths, which were stowed in the semi-open baggage car decorated with flowers and emblazoned with swastikas. To the sounds of “I had a comrade”, the crowd swore Schlageter's motto "Heil, Sieg und Rache".

In 1935, at the end of Spemann's acceptance speech for the Nobel Prize, he gave a Nazi salute.

== See also ==
- Theodor Boveri
- Developmental biology
- Morphogenesis
- August Weismann
