= Homeobox protein goosecoid =

Protein-coding gene in the species Homo sapiens

GSC
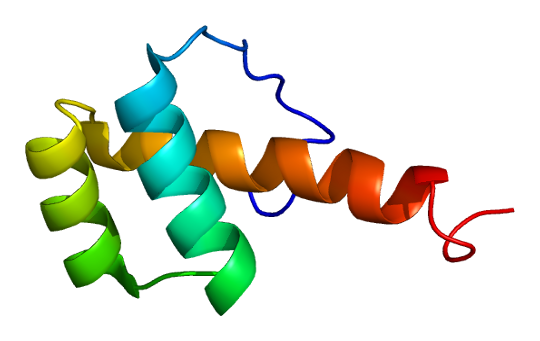

Identifiers
- Aliases: GSC, SAMS, goosecoid homeobox
- External IDs: OMIM: 138890; MGI: 95841; GeneCards: GSC
Available structures
PDB	Ortholog search: PDBe RCSB
PDB	List of PDB id codes 2DMU

Gene location (Human)
Chr.	Chromosome 14 (human)
Band	14q32.13	Start	94,768,223 bp
Band	14q32.13	End	94,770,113 bp

Gene location (Mouse)
Chr.	Chromosome 12 (mouse)
Band	12 E|12 54.32 cM	Start	104,437,468 bp
Band	12 E|12 54.32 cM	End	104,439,589 bp
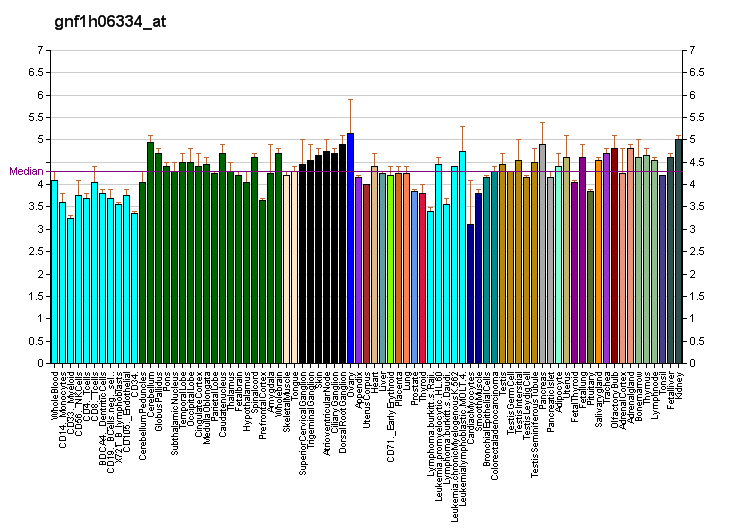
RNA expression pattern
Bgee	Human / Mouse (ortholog); Top expressed in: testicle; Achilles tendon; muscle of thigh; olfactory zone of nasal mucosa; subcutaneous adipose tissue; gastrocnemius muscle; right lobe of thyroid gland; left lobe of thyroid gland; apex of heart; granulocyte / Top expressed in: female urethra; condyle; male urethra; mandible; mandibular prominence; left atrium; embryo; hypoblast; endoderm; embryo; More reference expression data
BioGPS	More reference expression data
Gene ontology
Molecular function	sequence-specific DNA binding; DNA binding; RNA polymerase II cis-regulatory region sequence-specific DNA binding; DNA-binding transcription repressor activity, RNA polymerase II-specific; DNA-binding transcription factor activity, RNA polymerase II-specific
Cellular component	transcription regulator complex; nucleus; nuclear body
Biological process	embryonic skeletal system morphogenesis; multicellular organism development; neural crest cell fate specification; negative regulation of Wnt signaling pathway; forebrain development; dorsal/ventral neural tube patterning; anatomical structure morphogenesis; signal transduction involved in regulation of gene expression; ear development; regulation of transcription, DNA-templated; negative regulation of transcription by RNA polymerase II; gastrulation; muscle organ morphogenesis; middle ear morphogenesis
Sources:Amigo / QuickGO
Orthologs
Databases	NCBI: entry; OMA: entry
Species	Human	Mouse
Entrez	145258	14836
Ensembl	ENSG00000133937	ENSMUSG00000021095
UniProt	P56915	Q02591
RefSeq (mRNA)	NM_173849	NM_010351
RefSeq (protein)	NP_776248	NP_034481
Location (UCSC)	Chr 14: 94.77 – 94.77 Mb	Chr 12: 104.44 – 104.44 Mb
PubMed search
- Wikidata
View/Edit Human	View/Edit Mouse

Homeobox protein goosecoid (GSC) is a homeobox protein that is encoded in humans by the GSC gene. Like other homeobox proteins, goosecoid functions as a transcription factor involved in morphogenesis. In Xenopus, GSC is thought to play a crucial role in the phenomenon of the Spemann-Mangold organizer. Through lineage tracing and timelapse microscopy, the effects of GSC on neighboring cell fates could be observed. In an experiment that injected cells with GSC and observed the effects of uninjected cells, GSC recruited neighboring uninjected cells in the dorsal blastopore lip of the Xenopus gastrula to form a twinned dorsal axis, suggesting that the goosecoid protein plays a role in the regulation and migration of cells during gastrulation.

It is not clear how GSC conducts this organizational function. Errors in the formation of goosecoid protein in mice and humans have a range of consequences on the developing embryo typically in regions of neural crest cell derivatives, the hip and shoulder joints, and craniofacial development. Short stature, auditory canal atresia, mandibular hypoplasia, and skeletal abnormalities (SAMS) was thought to be a rare autosomal recessive developmental disorder, but through whole-exome sequencing, it was discovered that SAMS is the result of a mutation of the GSC gene. The data collected from the whole-exome sequencing, as well as the phenotypical presentation of SAMS, indicates that in mammals, the goosecoid protein is involved with the regulation and migration of neural crest cell fates and other mesodermal patterning, notably joints like the shoulders and hips.

== Function ==
The GSC gene defines neural-crest cell-fate specification and contributes to dorsal-ventral patterning. Over activation in Xenopus promotes dorso-anterior migration and dorsalization of mesodermal tissue of the cells along with BMP-4. Conversely, loss-of-functions analysis indirectly prevented head formation in Xenopus and head defects in zebrafish. Although, knock-out studies in mice showed that the GSC gene is not required for gastrulation, knocking out the gene results in there still being a reduction of the base of the cranium. A mutation in the GSC gene in Drosophila is lethal.

GSC gene promotes the formation of Spemann’s Organizer. This organizer prevents BMP-4 from inducing the ectoderm in the future head region of the embryo to become epidermis; it instead allows the future head region to form neural folds, which will eventually turn into the brain and spinal cord. For normal anterior development to occur, Spemann’s organizer cannot express the Xwnt-8 or BMP-4 transcription factors. GSC directly represses the expression of Xwnt-8 while indirectly repressing BMP-4. The inhibition of Xwnt-8 and BMP-4 ensures that normal anterior development, promoted by Spemann’s organizer, can occur.

The expression of GSC occurs twice in development, first during gastrulation and second during organogenesis. GSC is found in high concentrations in the dorsal mesoderm and endoderm during gastrulation. The later expression of GSC is confined to the head region. In the frog Xenopus, cells that express GSC become the pharyngeal endoderm, the head's mesoderm, ventral skeletal tissue of the head, and the notocord.

== Mutations ==
A mutation in the GSC gene causes short stature, auditory canal atresia, mandibular hypoplasia, and skeletal abnormalities (SAMS). SAMS was previously thought to be an autosomal-recessive disorder but studies with molecular karyotyping and whole-exome sequencing (WES) has shown otherwise.

Mutations in the Gsc gene can lead to specific phenotypes resulting from the second expression of the Gsc gene during organogenesis. Mice knock-out models of the gene express defects in the tongue, nasal cavity, nasal pits, inner ear, and external auditory meatus. Neonate mice born with this mutation die within 24 hours due to complication with breathing and sucking milk, resulting from the craniofacial abnormalities caused by the mutation. Mutations to the Gsc gene in humans can lead to a condition known as SAMS syndrome, characterized by short stature, auditory canal atresia, mandibular hypoplasia, and skeletal abnormalities.

== Role in cancer development ==
Due to its role as a transcription factor in cell migration during embryonic development, GSC has been looked into as a potential role-player in cancer development and metastasis, since embryonic development and cancer development share similar characteristics. GSC, along with other transcription factors like Twist, FOXC2, and Snail, induce epithelial to mesenchymal transitions by regulating the cell adhesion proteins E-cadherin, α-catenin and γ-catenin expression in epithelial cells. Studies have shown that in highly metastatic ovarian, lung, breast, and other cancer cells, GSC is highly expressed early in the progression of the tumor. Furthermore, high levels of GSC expression in cancer cells correlates with poor survival rates and thus can be used as a prognostic tool. High expression of GSC also correlates with the chemoresistance of the cancer. Therefore, GSC “primes cells for the expression of aggressive phenotypes” and “may be the most potential biomarker of drug response and poor prognosis.”
