= Ingression (biology) =

Ingression is one of the many changes in the location or relative position of cells that takes place during the gastrulation stage of embryonic development. It produces an animal's mesenchymal cells at the onset of gastrulation. During the epithelial–mesenchymal transition (EMT), the primary mesenchyme cells (PMCs) detach from the epithelium and become internalized mesenchyme cells that can migrate freely.

While the mechanisms of ingression are not fully understood, studies using the sea urchin as a model organism have begun to shed light on this developmental process, and will be the focus here. There are three main changes that must occur within a cell to enable the process of ingression. The ingressing PMCs must first alter their affinity for the neighboring epithelial cells that will remain in the vegetal pole (vertebrate PMCs ingress from the primitive streak). During this time, these cells must lose their affinity for the hyaline layer to which their apical surface is attached. The ingressing cells will then apically constrict and alter their cellular architecture through a dramatic reorganization of their cytoskeleton. Lastly, these cells will modify their mode of motility and presumably gain affinity for the basal lamina which composes the lining of the blastocoel, the future migration substrate of the PMCs.

A computational model of Clytia hemisphaerica gastrulation. Red cells depict presumptive endodermal cells, and blue cells depict presumptive ectodermal cells.

Changes in the adhesion properties of these cells are the best characterized and understood mechanism of ingression. In sea urchins, epithelial cells adhere to one another as well as the hyaline layer through classic cadherins and adherens junctions. Ingression is a very dynamic process however, and the first sign of an ingressing cell is seen when a future PMC loses its adhesion to hyaline, and cadherin, and increases its adhesion to a basal laminal substrate. These processes occur rapidly, over approximately 30 minutes. It is not understood how the PMCs penetrate the basal lamina. The basal lamina is a loose matrix, therefore it is possible that the ingressing cells squeeze through the matrix. It is also hypothesized that the PMCs use a protease. EMT is determined by a dynamic gene regulatory network (GRN). snail and twist are two key transcription factors that makes up the GRN. Within an hour of ingression, numerous transcript factors are activated. It is known that beta-catenin (β-catenin) plays a key role in EMT. When β-catenin function is blocked, no EMT results. If β-catenin is over-expressed, too many cells undergo EMT. The vascular endothelial growth factor receptor is also necessary for the PMCs to function as mesenchymal cells. Lastly, it is thought that the ingression of PMCs is further facilitated simply through the simultaneous ingression neighboring cells.

Within birds and mammals, epiblast cells converge at the midline and ingress at the primitive streak. Ingression of these cells results in formation of the mesoderm. The use of ingression to internalize presumptive mesoderm is considered a major evolutionary change in mesoderm morphogenesis within chordates. Within chordate embryos, there is an evolutionary trend exhibited in the mechanisms used to internalize presumptive mesoderm. Basal chordates rely predominantly on invagination, anamniote vertebrates and reptiles on a varying combination of involution and ingression, and birds and mammals primarily on ingression.

Besides ingression, two other types of internalizing cell movements may occur during gastrulation: invagination and involution.
