= Alfonso Martínez =

Alfonso Martínez may refer to:

- Alfonso Martinez (actor) (born 1988), Filipino actor
- Alfonso Martínez Alcázar (born 1975), Mexican politician from Michoacán
- Alfonso Martínez Arias (born 1955), Spanish-British developmental biologist
- Alfonso Martínez (basketball) (1937–2011), Spanish basketball player
- Alfonso Martínez Domínguez (1922–2002), Mexican politician from Nuevo León
- Alfonso Martinez-Fonts Jr. (born 1949), U.S. businessman and public official
- Alfonso Martínez (football manager), manager of Real Valladolid in 1943
- Alfonso Martínez Garrido (1936–1996), Spanish writer and journalist, winner of the 1964 Premio Nadal
- Alfonso Martínez (taekwondo), Belizean taekwondo martial artist
- Alfonso Martínez de Toledo (c. 1398–c. 1470), Castilian poet and writer known as the "Archpriest of Talavera"
