= Vegetal rotation =

Biological process

An illustration of vegetal rotation movements.

Vegetal rotation is a morphogenetic movement that drives mesoderm internalization during gastrulation in amphibian embryos. The internalization of vegetal cells prior to gastrulation was first observed in the 1930s by Abraham Mandel Schechtman through the use of vital dye labeling experiments in Triturus torosus embryos. More recently, Winklbauer and Schürfeld (1999) described the internal movements in more detail using pregastrular explants of Xenopus laevis.

Gastrulation in amphibians is initiated by formation of bottle cells at the dorsal marginal zone, followed by involution of prospective mesodermal cells. The mesoderm and endoderm then migrate animally along the blastocoel roof, driven in part by movement of the vegetal endoderm cells. In Xenopus embryos in which the blastocoel roof is removed prior to gastrulation, the movement of vegetal cells toward the blastocoel and their intercalation into the blastocoel floor causes the floor to spread, pushing the dorsal edge downward. In the context of the embryo, active vegetal rotation, together with epiboly of the animal cap ectodermal cells, appears to bring the vegetal mesendoderm into contact with the blastocoel roof. This movement results in formation of Brachet's cleft. As gastrulation continues, further spreading of the blastocoel floor by upward movement of vegetal cells contributes to the advancement of the mesendoderm along the blastocoel roof. This process is aided by crawling mesodermal cells at the leading edge of the mesendoderm. Much like bottle cell formation at the blastopore lip, vegetal rotation begins at the dorsal side of the embryo, and spreads laterally to the ventral side. These processes, however, occur independently. While vegetal rotation appears to be important prior to and in the early stages of gastrulation, by stages 10.5–11, vegetal rotation ceases and further involution appears to be driven primarily by cell rearrangements.
