= Gastrulation =

Embryologic stage in which germ layers form

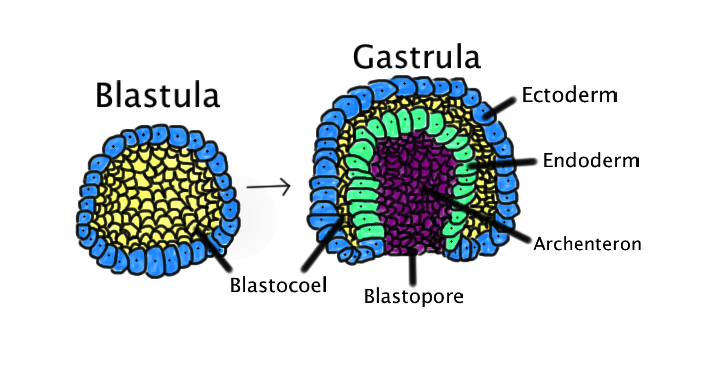
- Gastrulation occurs when a blastula, made up of one layer, folds inward and enlarges to create a gastrula. This diagram is color-coded: ectoderm, blue; endoderm, green; blastocoel (the yolk sac), yellow; and archenteron (the primary gut), purple.

Identifiers
- MeSH: D054262

Gastrulation is the stage in the early embryonic development of most animals, during which the blastula (a single-layered hollow sphere of cells), or in mammals, the blastocyst, is reorganized into a two-layered or three-layered embryo known as the gastrula, with an infold named the blastopore. Before gastrulation, the embryo is a continuous epithelial sheet of cells; by the end of gastrulation, the embryo has begun differentiation to establish distinct cell lineages, set up the basic axes of the body (e.g. dorsal–ventral, anterior–posterior), and internalized one or more cell types, including the prospective gut. Gastrulation is regulated by signaling pathways including the following: BMP, Wnt, and Nodal. These pathways coordinate cell migration, axis formation, and lineage specification.

== Gastrula layers ==
A description of the gastrulation process in a human embryo in three dimensions

In triploblastic organisms, including the human, the gastrula is trilaminar (three-layered). These three germ layers are the ectoderm (outer layer), mesoderm (middle layer), and endoderm (inner layer). These germ layers form as epiblast cells move through the primitive streak, while undergoing epithelial-to-mesenchymal transition and ingression. This forms the mesoderm and endoderm, while the remaining epiblast cells differentiate into the ectoderm. In diploblastic organisms, such as Cnidaria and Ctenophora, the gastrula has only ectoderm and endoderm. The two layers are also sometimes referred to as the hypoblast and epiblast. Sponges do not go through the gastrula stage.

Gastrulation takes place after cleavage and the formation of the blastula, or blastocyst (see blastulation). Gastrulation is followed by organogenesis, when individual organs develop within the newly formed germ layers. Each layer gives rise to specific tissues and organs in the developing embryo.

- The ectoderm gives rise to epidermis, the nervous system, and to the neural crest in vertebrates.
- The endoderm gives rise to the epithelium of the digestive system and respiratory system, and organs associated with the digestive system, such as the liver and pancreas.
- The mesoderm gives rise to many cell types such as muscle, bone, and connective tissue. In vertebrates, mesoderm derivatives include the notochord, the heart, blood and blood vessels, the cartilage of the ribs and vertebrae, and the dermis.

== Basic cell movements ==
Although gastrulation patterns exhibit enormous variation throughout the animal kingdom, they are unified by the five basic types of cell movements that occur during gastrulation:

1. Invagination: Inward rolling of a cell layer on itself to form an indentation
2. Involution: The inward rolling of a cell layer over an edge for it to spread over the interior surface
3. Ingression: Migration of cells from the external layer into the interior of the embryo
4. Delamination: The splitting of one sheet into two parallel layers
5. Epiboly: The expansion and thinning of the cell layer to enclose deeper layers

These movements drive germ layer formation and contributes to the differentiation of the body plan during gastrulation.

== Etymology ==
The terms "gastrula" and "gastrulation" were coined by Ernst Haeckel, in his 1872 work "Biology of Calcareous Sponges". Gastrula (literally, "little belly") is a neo-Latin diminutive based on the Ancient Greek γαστήρ gastḗr ("a belly").

== Importance ==
Lewis Wolpert, pioneering developmental biologist in the field, has been credited for noting that "It is not birth, marriage, or death, but gastrulation which is truly the most important time in your life."

== Model systems ==
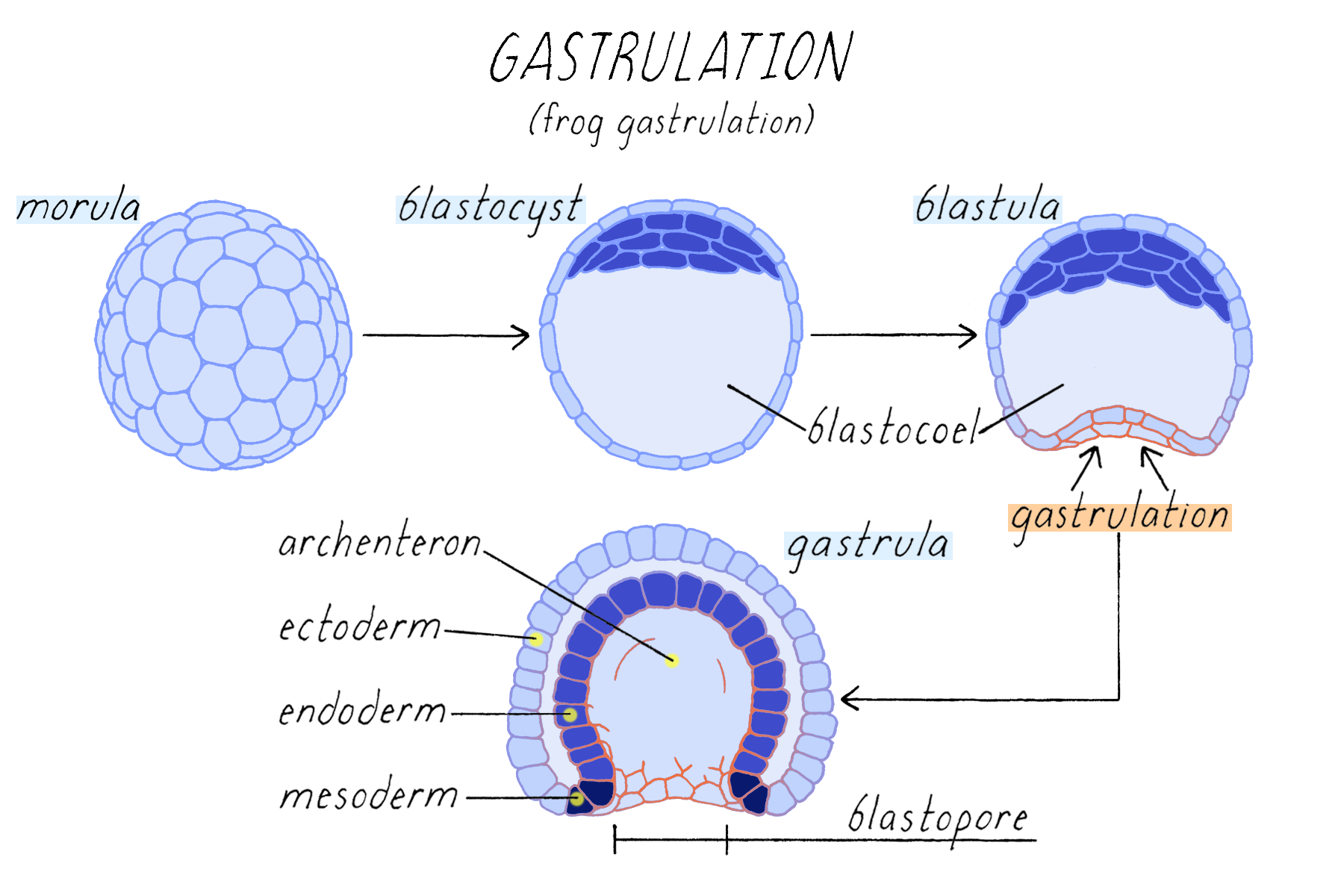
The early developmental process that transforms a frog embryo from a two dimensional (flat) layer of cells (the blastula) into a 3D, multilayered, embryo known as the gastrula.

Gastrulation is highly variable across the animal kingdom but has underlying similarities. Gastrulation has been studied in many animals, but some models have been used for longer than others. Furthermore, it is easier to study development in animals that develop outside the mother. Model organisms whose gastrulation is understood in the greatest detail include the mollusc, sea urchin, frog, and chicken. A human model system is the gastruloid.

In all gastrulation events, there needs to be a signal to determine where to form the invagination, and after that other signals to drive the formation and differentiation of germ layers. There are parallels in both the physical steps and in the molecular pathways. The organizer, which sits in the center of this process, is a trait conserved among Cnidaria, Ctenophora, and Bilateria – all major groups of animals except sponges.

== Protostomes versus deuterostomes ==

The distinction between protostomes and deuterostomes was originally based on the direction in which the mouth (stoma) develops in relation to the blastopore. Protostome derives from the Greek word protostoma meaning "first mouth" (πρῶτος + στόμα) whereas Deuterostome's etymology is "second mouth" from the words second and mouth (δεύτερος + στόμα).

The major distinctions between deuterostomes and protostomes are found in embryonic development:

- Mouth/anus
  - In protostome development, the first opening in development, the blastopore, becomes the animal's mouth – at least this was the original definition. It is now known that the fate of the blastopore among protostomes is extremely variable; while the evolutionary distinction between deuterostomes and protostomes remains valid, the descriptive accuracy of the name protostome is disputable.
  - In deuterostome development, the blastopore becomes the animal's anus.
- Cleavage
  - Protostomes have what is known as spiral cleavage which is determinate, meaning that the fate of the cells is determined as they are formed.
  - Deuterostomes have what is known as radial cleavage that is indeterminate.

== Sea urchins ==
Sea urchins have been important model organisms in developmental biology since the 19th century. Their gastrulation is often considered the archetype for invertebrate deuterostomes.

Sea urchins exhibit highly stereotyped cleavage patterns and cell fates. Maternally deposited mRNAs establish the organizing center of the sea urchin embryo. Canonical Wnt and Delta-Notch signaling progressively segregate progressive endoderm and mesoderm.

The first cells to internalize are the primary mesenchyme cells (PMCs), which have a skeletogenic fate, which ingress during the blastula stage. Gastrulation – internalization of the prospective endoderm and non-skeletogenic mesoderm – begins shortly thereafter with invagination and other cell rearrangements the vegetal pole, which contribute approximately 30% to the final archenteron length. The gut's final length depends on cell rearrangements within the archenteron.

== Amphibians ==
The frog genus Xenopus has been used as a model organism for the study of gastrulation.

=== Symmetry breaking ===
The sperm contributes one of the two mitotic asters needed to complete first cleavage. The sperm can enter anywhere in the animal half of the egg but its exact point of entry will break the egg's radial symmetry by organizing the cytoskeleton. Prior to first cleavage, the egg's cortex rotates relative to the internal cytoplasm by the coordinated action of microtubules, in a process known as cortical rotation. This displacement brings maternally loaded determinants of cell fate from the equatorial cytoplasm and vegetal cortex into contact, and together these determinants set up the organizer. Thus, the area on the vegetal side opposite the sperm entry point will become the organizer. Hilde Mangold, working in the lab of Hans Spemann, demonstrated that this special "organizer" of the embryo is necessary and sufficient to induce gastrulation.

The dorsal lip of the blastopore is the organizer, and the first sign of invagination seen in the frog.

=== Germ layer differentiation ===
Specification of endoderm depends on rearrangement of maternally deposited determinants, leading to nuclearization of Beta-catenin. Mesoderm is induced by signaling from the presumptive endoderm to cells that would otherwise become ectoderm.

=== Cell signaling ===
In the frog, Xenopus, one of the signals is retinoic acid (RA). RA signaling in this organism can affect the formation of the endoderm and depending on the timing of the signaling, it can determine the fate whether its pancreatic, intestinal, or respiratory. Other signals such as Wnt and BMP also play a role in respiratory fate of the Xenopus by activating cell lineage tracers.

== Amniotes ==
=== Overview ===
In amniotes (reptiles, birds and mammals), gastrulation involves the creation of the blastopore, an opening into the archenteron. Note that the blastopore is not an opening into the blastocoel, the space within the blastula, but represents a new inpocketing that pushes the existing surfaces of the blastula together. In amniotes, gastrulation occurs in the following sequence: (1) the embryo becomes asymmetric; (2) the primitive streak forms; (3) cells from the epiblast at the primitive streak undergo an epithelial to mesenchymal transition and ingress at the primitive streak to form the germ layers.

=== Symmetry breaking ===
In preparation for gastrulation, the embryo must become asymmetric along both the proximal-distal axis and the anteroposterior axis. The proximal-distal axis is formed when the cells of the embryo form the "egg cylinder", which consists of the four membranes of the extraembryonic tissue, which give rise to structures like the placenta, at the proximal end and the epiblast at the distal end. Many signaling pathways contribute to this reorganization, including BMP, FGF, nodal, and Wnt. Visceral endoderm surrounds the epiblast. The distal visceral endoderm (DVE) migrates to the anterior portion of the embryo, forming the anterior visceral endoderm (AVE). This breaks anterior-posterior symmetry and is regulated by nodal signaling.

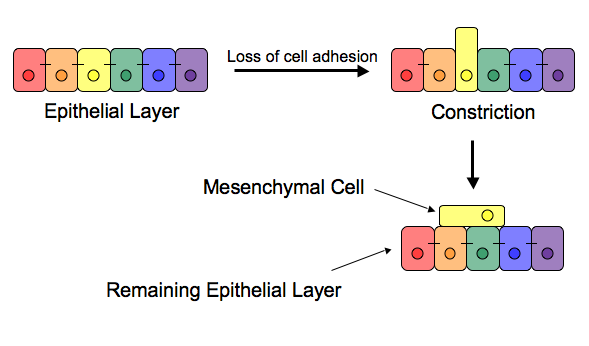
Epithelial–mesenchymal transition – loss of cell adhesion leads to constriction and extrusion of newly formed mesenchymal cell.

=== Germ layer determination ===
The primitive streak is formed at the beginning of gastrulation and is found at the junction between the extraembryonic tissue and the epiblast on the posterior side of the embryo and the site of ingression. Formation of the primitive streak is reliant upon nodal signaling in the Koller's sickle within the cells contributing to the primitive streak and BMP4 signaling from the extraembryonic tissue. Furthermore, Cer1 and Lefty1 restrict the primitive streak to the appropriate location by antagonizing nodal signaling. The region defined as the primitive streak continues to grow towards the distal tip.

During the early stages of development, the primitive streak is the structure that will establish bilateral symmetry, determine the site of gastrulation and initiate germ layer formation. To form the streak, reptiles, birds and mammals arrange mesenchymal cells along the prospective midline, establishing the first embryonic axis, as well as the place where cells will ingress and migrate during the process of gastrulation and germ layer formation. The primitive streak extends through this midline and creates the antero-posterior body axis, becoming the first symmetry-breaking event in the embryo, and marks the beginning of gastrulation. This process involves the ingression of mesoderm and endoderm progenitors and their migration to their ultimate position, where they will differentiate into the three germ layers. The localization of the cell adhesion and signaling molecule beta-catenin is critical to the proper formation of the organizer region that is responsible for initiating gastrulation.

=== Cell internalization ===
In order for the cells to move from the epithelium of the epiblast through the primitive streak to form a new layer, the cells must undergo an epithelial to mesenchymal transition (EMT) to lose their epithelial characteristics, such as cell–cell adhesion. FGF signaling is necessary for proper EMT. FGFR1 is needed for the up regulation of SNAI1, which down regulates E-cadherin, causing a loss of cell adhesion. Following the EMT, the cells ingress through the primitive streak and spread out to form a new layer of cells or join existing layers. FGF8 is implicated in the process of this dispersal from the primitive streak.

== Cell signaling driving gastrulation ==
During gastrulation, the cells are differentiated into the ectoderm or mesendoderm, which then separates into the mesoderm and endoderm. The endoderm and mesoderm form due to the nodal signaling. Nodal signaling uses ligands that are part of TGFβ family. These ligands will signal transmembrane serine/threonine kinase receptors, and this will then phosphorylate Smad2 and Smad3. This protein will then attach itself to Smad4 and relocate to the nucleus where the mesendoderm genes will begin to be transcribed. The Wnt pathway along with β-catenin plays a key role in nodal signaling and endoderm formation. Fibroblast growth factors (FGF), canonical Wnt pathway, bone morphogenetic protein (BMP), and retinoic acid (RA) are all important in the formation and development of the endoderm. FGF are important in producing the homeobox gene which regulates early anatomical development. BMP signaling plays a role in the liver and promotes hepatic fate. RA signaling also induce homeobox genes such as Hoxb1 and Hoxa5. In mice, if there is a lack in RA signaling the mouse will not develop lungs. RA signaling also has multiple uses in organ formation of the pharyngeal arches, the foregut, and hindgut.

== Gastrulation in vitro ==
There have been a number of attempts to understand the processes of gastrulation using in vitro techniques in parallel and complementary to studies in embryos, usually though the use of 2D and 3D cell (Embryonic organoids) culture techniques using embryonic stem cells (ESCs) or induced pluripotent stem cells (iPSCs). These are associated with number of clear advantages in using tissue-culture based protocols, some of which include reducing the cost of associated in vivo work (thereby reducing, replacing and refining the use of animals in experiments; the 3Rs), being able to accurately apply agonists/antagonists in spatially and temporally specific manner which may be technically difficult to perform during Gastrulation. However, it is important to relate the observations in culture to the processes occurring in the embryo for context.

To illustrate this, the guided differentiation of mouse ESCs has resulted in generating primitive streak–like cells that display many of the characteristics of epiblast cells that traverse through the primitive streak (e.g. transient brachyury up regulation and the cellular changes associated with an epithelial to mesenchymal transition), and human ESCs cultured on micro patterns, treated with BMP4, can generate spatial differentiation pattern similar to the arrangement of the germ layers in the human embryo. Finally, using 3D embryoid body- and organoid-based techniques, small aggregates of mouse ESCs (Embryonic Organoids, or Gastruloids) are able to show a number of processes of early mammalian embryo development such as symmetry-breaking, polarisation of gene expression, gastrulation-like movements, axial elongation and the generation of all three embryonic axes (anteroposterior, dorsoventral and left-right axes).

In vitro fertilization occurs in a laboratory. The process of in vitro fertilization is when mature eggs are removed from the ovaries and are placed in a cultured medium where they are fertilized by sperm. In the culture the embryo will form. 14 days after fertilization the primitive streak forms. The formation of the primitive streak has been known to some countries as "human individuality". This means that the embryo is now a being itself, it is its own entity. The countries that believe this have created a 14-day rule in which it is illegal to study or experiment on a human embryo after the 14-day period in vitro. Research has been conducted on the first 14 days of an embryo, but no known studies have been done after the 14 days. With the rule in place, mice embryos are used understand the development after 14 days; however, there are differences in the development between mice and humans.

== See also ==
- Fate mapping
- Neurulation
- Primitive node
- Vegetal rotation
