= Biofilling =

Technique in dentistry

Biofilling, also known as the orthograde canal grafting technique or 4D sealing, is an endodontic root canal obturation technique with a Bioceramic material after root canal preparation and enlargement procedure.

== Indications ==
All diagnoses of the teeth lead to endodontic therapy and retreatment procedures. Biofilling is specially indicated for severely infected root canals, perforations, cracked teeth, file separations, apexogenesis, and simple endodontic obturations.

== Advantages of Biofilling over Gutta Percha Techniques ==
1. Physical Sealing - After Biofilling, the watertight apical plug is formed at the apical constriction of the apical foramen. Triple MTA sealing (apical, middle, and coronal) is achieved by the jamming effect. Physical sealing occurs just after Biofilling.

Formation of the apical plug can prevent the apical percolation of nutrient tissue fluid. In addition, an apical plug can make a highly alkaline environment. These two functions kill off bacteria in this area including the dentinal tubules.

2. Chemical Sealing - Chemical sealing occurs during the formation of short-tag calcium silicate hydrate at the interfacial surface and orifice of dentinal tubules and long-tag calcium deficient hydroxyl apatite in the lumen of dentinal tubules. Chemical sealing is the result of the hydraulic chemical reaction.

3. Biological Sealing - During Biofilling, a Bioceramic material is used. The material is nonirritating to periapical tissues and also induces the regeneration of cementum and the periodontal ligament. The immune cells release lymphokines required for the repair and regeneration of cementum.

== Drawbacks of Gutta Percha ==
1. No sealability (no adhesion to dentine) It was concluded that gutta percha's drawback is the lack of seal. Failure of root canal treatment is directly related to the lack of seal on the coronal 1/3 and apical 1/3 portion. A. Coronal 1/3 The problem is with the Obtura backfill that is used in the warm gutta percha technique. Under the surgical microscope, there is an obvious gap between the heated and cooled gutta percha and the dentinal wall. It is a wide gap for the microorganisms to enter. Microleakage in the coronal 1/3 is the main cause for retreatment.

B. Apical 1/3 The apical portion of the root canal can never be dried because of the tissue fluid. The commonly used AH26 and AH plus do not set properly and they dissolve under moist conditions. Even in a 100% dry condition, these sealers shrink after the final setting reaction. It becomes naturally soluble over time. One of the systems of gutta percha which is used together with the sealers mentioned is a System B plugger that generates heat on the collagen of the dentin that weakens the tensile strength of the root. Trans-1,4-polyisoprene, a main component of the gutta percha, has been reported as a degradable material regardless of the mode of application which causes the formation of a gap between the dentinal wall and the material.

2. Bacterial degradation Gutta percha is made up of 14.5-21.8% Trans-1,4-Polyisoprene which can be degraded and form a visible gap due to the 18% of microorganisms present in an in vitro study. Actinomyces, a bacterium that is found inside the canal, has the ability to degrade trans-1,4-polyisoprene. The internal root canal system in-vivo is anaerobic but even without the presence of bacteria, the C=O polymer chain will be lysed slowly into OH and C=O over time. Particularly during the presence of a periapical lesion, the penetration of bacteria present in the lesion will cause it to degrade rapidly. Effusion of degraded products through the periodontal membrane that are toxic will cause irritation. Over time, the formation of a gap inside the root canal will allow the penetration of new bacteria and endotoxin. This phenomenon has continued for 5 to 15 years. The cause of a periapical lesion in an asymptomatic tooth one day will be due to the degradation of trans-1,4-polyisoprene

== Materials used for Biofilling ==
The response of both the patients and dentists have been significant since the bioceramics were introduced to endodontics. The benefits that the practitioners gain with using bioceramic material are the physical properties, such as biocompatibility, anti-bacterial effect, non-toxic and no shrinkage nor expansion, chemical properties such as stability within the biological environment, does not result in a significant inflammatory response, and bioactive properties such as tissue regenerative capacity which induces new cementum formation and tertiary dentin. These benefits have brought a new horizon in Endodontics which is the ability to save more natural teeth with great long-term prognosis.

- Characteristics of the bioceramic materials

Bioceramis are ceramic materials that is specifically made for use in medicine and in dentistry. They include alumina and zirconia, bioactive glass, etc.

- Main composition of bioceramic material used in dentistry'

1. Hydraulic Calcium Silicates (Tricalcium silicate, Dicalcium silicate, Tricalcium aluminate).

2. Alumina or Zirconia

3. No gypsum (Calcium sulfate)

== Procedure ==
- Canal Enlargement (CE)

Although considerable bacterial reduction can be achieved by the mechanical action of instruments and irrigation solutions, microorganisms are rarely eliminated from the root canals regardless of the instrumentation technique and file sizes employed. Due to the anatomical localization of the endodontic infection, it only can be treated through professional intervention using both chemical and mechanical procedures. However, many studies have proved that total elimination of bacteria can not be observed in most of the cases.

- Canal Irrigation (CI)

Minor anatomical irregularities are usually incorporated into preparation, other areas such as Isthmuses, branches, and dentinal tubules can harbor microorganisms. These areas are not commonly affected by the chemo mechanical preparation because of inherent physical limitations of instruments and the short time the irrigation solutions are present within the root canal.

The larger the apical preparation, the higher the percentage of bacteria eliminated from the root canal. But, Ingle and Zeldow have observed that 80 percent of the initially infected root canals increased to 95.4 percent at the second appointment, 48 hours later.

Although a considerable reduction in bacterial cell by instrumentation and irrigation, viable bacteria can still be found in at least half of the cases.

- Canal Grafting (CG)
