= Apical constriction =

One-sided contraction of a cell

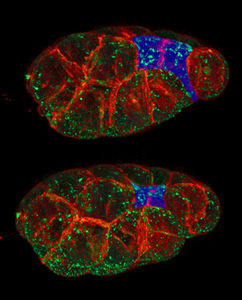
Two stages in the constriction of apical surfaces (blue) of a pair of cells in C. elegans.

In morphogenesis, apical constriction is the process in which contraction of the apical side of a cell causes the cell to take on a wedged shape. Generally, this shape change is coordinated across many cells of an epithelial layer, generating forces that can bend or fold the cell sheet.

== Morphogenetic role ==
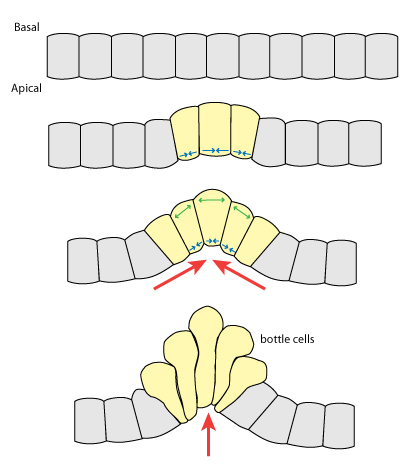
Constriction of the apical side of cells in an epithelial layer generates enough force initiate invagination. In gastrulation, the apically constricting cells are known as bottle cells. The bottle shape results when constriction of the apical side of the cell squeezes the cytoplasm, thus expanding the basal side.

Apical constriction plays a central role in important morphogenetic events in both invertebrates and vertebrates. It is typically the first step in any invagination process and is also important in folding tissues at specified hingepoints.

During gastrulation in both invertebrates and vertebrates, apical constriction of a ring of cells leads to blastopore formation. These cells are known as bottle cells, for their eventual shape. Because all of the cells constrict on the apical side, the epithelial sheet bends convexly on the basal side.

In vertebrates, apical constriction plays a role in a range of other morphogenetic processes such neurulation, placode formation, and primitive streak formation.

== Mechanism ==
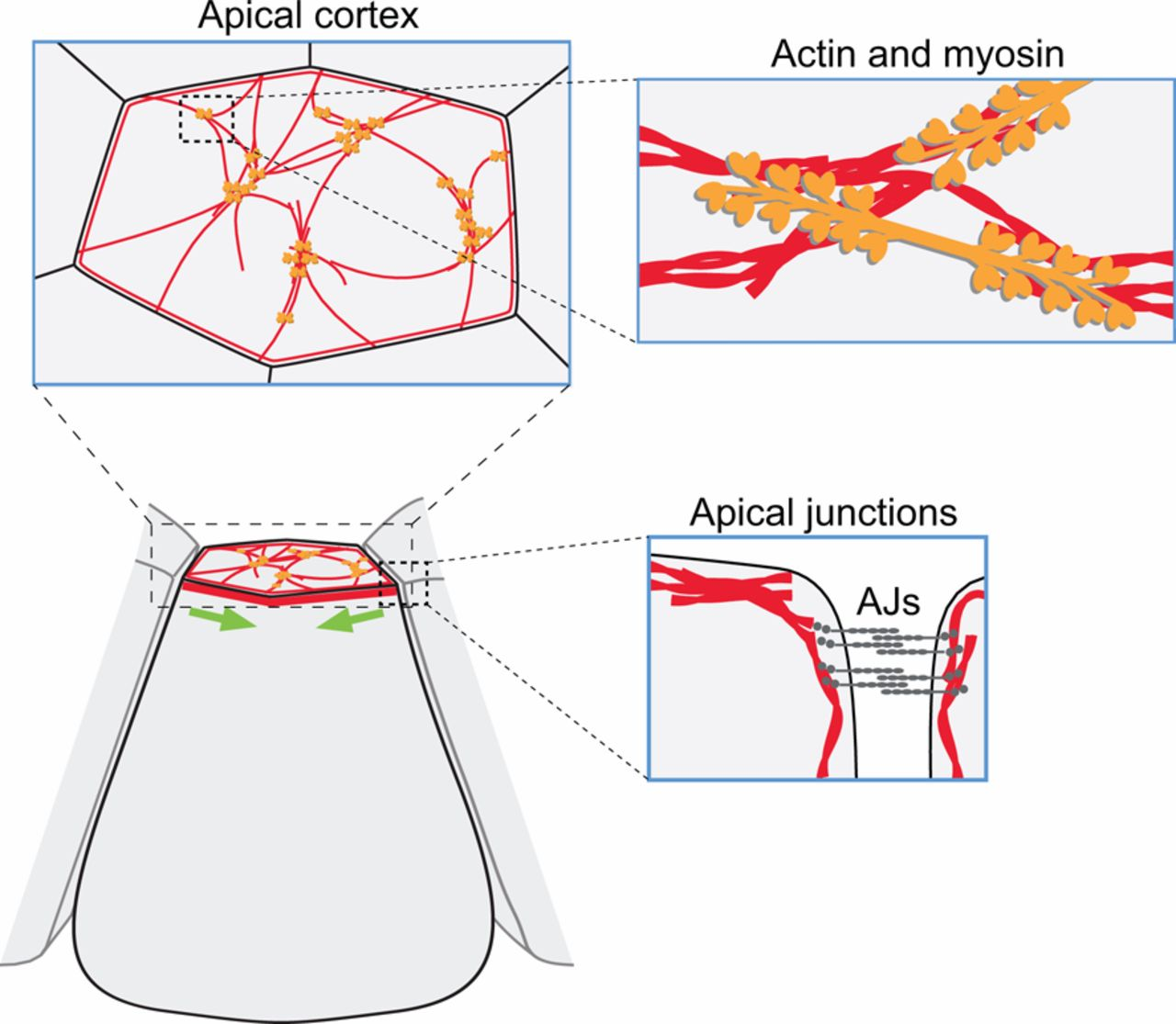
Apical constriction mechanisms (red: filamentous actin. orange: myosin.)

Apical constriction occurs primarily through the contraction of cytoskeletal elements. The specific mechanism depends on the species, the cell type, and the morphogenetic movement. Model organisms that have been studied include the frog Xenopus, and the fly Drosophila.

=== Xenopus ===
During Xenopus gastrulation, bottle cells are located in the dorsal marginal zone and apically constrict inwards to initiate involution of the blastopore. In these cells, apical constriction occurs when actomyosin contractility folds the cell membrane to reduce the apical surface area. Endocytosis of the membrane at the apical side further reduces surface area. Active trafficking of these endocytosed vesicles along microtubule tracks is also believed to be important, since the depolymerization (but not stabilization) of microtubules reduces the extent of apical constriction.

Although apical constriction is always observed, it is not necessary for gastrulation, indicating that there are other morphogenetic forces working in parallel. Researchers have shown that the removal of bottle cells does not inhibit gastrulation, but simply makes it less efficient. Bottle cell removal does, however, result in deformed embryos.

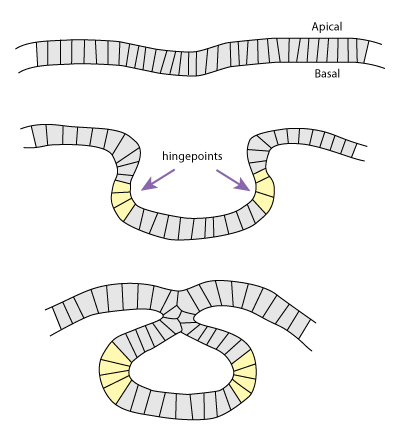
Apical constriction of cells at the hingepoints of neural folds generates forces that participate in neural tube closure.

Neural tube cells in Xenopus apically constrict during the initial invagination as well as during hingepoint folding. Here, the mechanism depends upon the protein Shroom3, which is sufficient to drive apical constriction. Because Shroom3 is an actin-binding protein and accumulates on the apical side, the most likely mechanism is that Shroom3 aggregates the actin meshwork, generating a squeezing force. Ectopic Shroom3 has been shown to be sufficient to induce apical constriction, but only in cells with apico-basal polarity.

=== Drosophila ===
The molecular picture of apical constriction is most complete for Drosophila. During Drosophila gastrulation, apical constriction of midline cells initiates invagination to create the ventral furrow. Like in Xenopus, actomyosin contractility plays a major role in constricting the apical side of the cell. The constricting cells have an actin meshwork directly beneath the apical membrane as well as circumferential actin belts lining the adherens junctions between cells. Pulsed contractions of the actin meshwork are believed to be primarily responsible for reducing the apical surface area.

In Drosophila, researchers have also pinpointed the molecules responsible for coordinating apical constriction in time. Protein folded gastrulation (Fog), a secreted protein and Concertina, a G alpha protein, are members of the same pathway that ensure that apical constriction is initiated in the right cells at the right time. The transmembrane protein T48 is part of a redundant pathway that is also needed for coordination of apical constriction. Both pathways must be disrupted in order to completely block ventral furrow formation. Both pathways also regulate the localization of RhoGEF2, a member of the Rho family GTPases, which are known to regulate actin dynamics.
