= Shrooms =

Shrooms may refer to:

- Mushrooms
  - Or specifically psilocybin mushrooms
- Shrooms (film), a 2007 horror film
- Super Mushroom, a power-up item in the Super Mario series
- The Shroom protein family
