= Cerberus (protein) =

Protein found in humans

CER1

Identifiers
- Aliases: CER1, DAND4, cerberus 1, DAN family BMP antagonist
- External IDs: OMIM: 603777; MGI: 1201414; GeneCards: CER1

Gene location (Human)
Chr.	Chromosome 9 (human)
Band	9p22.3	Start	14,719,724 bp
Band	9p22.3	End	14,722,733 bp

Gene location (Mouse)
Chr.	Chromosome 4 (mouse)
Band	4 C3|4 39.4 cM	Start	82,799,988 bp
Band	4 C3|4 39.4 cM	End	82,803,385 bp
RNA expression pattern
Bgee	Human / Mouse (ortholog); Top expressed in: gonad; cerebellar cortex; cerebellar hemisphere; right hemisphere of cerebellum; apex of heart; caudate nucleus; smooth muscle tissue; human kidney; gastric mucosa; popliteal artery / Top expressed in: endoderm; primitive endoderm; definitive endoderm; embryo; mesoderm; epiblast; spinal ganglia; embryo; pretectal area; primitive streak; More reference expression data
BioGPS	n/a
Gene ontology
Molecular function	cytokine activity; protein homodimerization activity; BMP binding; morphogen activity
Cellular component	extracellular region; extracellular space
Biological process	bone mineralization; ureteric bud development; growth plate cartilage chondrocyte proliferation; sequestering of BMP in extracellular matrix; negative regulation of Wnt signaling pathway; cellular response to BMP stimulus; BMP signaling pathway; nervous system development; negative regulation of BMP signaling pathway; negative regulation of activin receptor signaling pathway; determination of dorsal identity; gastrulation; negative regulation of mesoderm development; cell migration involved in gastrulation; anterior/posterior axis specification; anterior/posterior pattern specification; negative regulation of cell population proliferation; signal transduction involved in regulation of gene expression; determination of heart left/right asymmetry; negative regulation of nodal signaling pathway involved in determination of lateral mesoderm left/right asymmetry; regulation of signaling receptor activity
Sources:Amigo / QuickGO
Orthologs
Databases	NCBI: entry; OMA: entry
Species	Human	Mouse
Entrez	9350	12622
Ensembl	ENSG00000147869	ENSMUSG00000038192
UniProt	O95813	O55233
RefSeq (mRNA)	NM_005454	NM_009887
RefSeq (protein)	NP_005445	NP_034017
Location (UCSC)	Chr 9: 14.72 – 14.72 Mb	Chr 4: 82.8 – 82.8 Mb
PubMed search
- Wikidata
View/Edit Human	View/Edit Mouse

Cerberus is a protein that in humans is encoded by the CER1 gene. Cerberus is a signaling molecule which contributes to the formation of the head, heart and left-right asymmetry of internal organs. This gene varies slightly from species to species but its overall functions seem to be similar.

Cerberus is secreted by the anterior visceral endoderm and blocks the action of BMP, Nodal and Wnt, secreted by the primitive node, which allows for the formation of a head region. This is accomplished by inhibiting the formation of mesoderm in this region. Xenopus Cerberus causes a protein to be secreted that is able to induce the formation of an ectopic head. Knockdown experiments have helped to explain Cerberus's role in both the formation of the head and left and right symmetry. These experiments have shown that Cerberus helps to keep Nodal from crossing to the right side of the developing embryo, allowing left and right asymmetry to form. This is why misexpression of Cerberus can cause the heart to fold in the opposite direction during development. When Cerberus is "knocked down" and BMP and Wnt are up regulated the head does not form. Other experiments using mice that this gene has been "knocked out" showed no head defects, which suggest that it is the combination of the up regulation of BMP and Wnt along with the absence of Cerberus that causes this defect. For the heart, Cerberus is one of several factors that inhibits Nodal to initiate cardiomyogenic differentiation

The Cerberus gene family produces many different signal proteins that are antagonistically involved in establishing anterior-posterior patterning and left-right patterning in vertebrate embryos.

== Function ==
Cerberus is an inhibitor in the TGF beta signaling pathway secreted during the gastrulation phase of embryogenesis. Cerberus (Cer) is a gene that encodes a cytokine (a secreted signaling protein) important for induction and formation of the heart and head in vertebrates. The Cerberus gene encodes a polypeptide that is 270 amino acids in length and is expressed in the anterior domain of a gastrula in the endoderm layer. Cerberus also plays a large role as an inhibitory molecule, which is important for proper head induction. Cerberus inhibits the proteins bone morphogenetic protein 4 (BMP4), Xnr1, and Xwnt8.

This gene encodes a cytokine member of the cystine knot superfamily, characterized by nine conserved cysteines and a cysteine knot region. The cerberus-related cytokines, together with Dan and DRM / Gremlin, represent a group of bone morphogenetic protein (BMP) antagonists that can bind directly to BMPs and inhibit their activity.

In human embryonic development, Cerberus and the protein coded by GREM3 inhibit NODAL in the Wnt signaling pathway during the formation of the germ layers. Specifically, Cerberus and GREM3 act as antagonists to Nodal in the anterior region of the developing embryo, blocking its expression and halting the progression of the primitive node. Orthologs of the gene that codes Cerberus (CER1) are conserved in other non-rodent mammals, indicating that Cerberus has similar functions in other vertebrates.

A gene knockdown experiment was conducted in Xenopus, where the amount of Cerberus expressed was decreased by inhibiting translation. The proteins that Cerberus inhibits (BMP4, Xnr1, Xwnt8) concentrations were increased also. It was also shown that just the decrease of Cerberus translation alone was not enough to inhibit the formation of head structures. While the increase of just BMP4, Xnr1, Xwnt8 led to defects in the formation of the head. The increase of BMP4, Xnr1, Xwnt8 and the decrease of Cerberus together blocked the formation of the head. This gene knockdown experiment showed the necessity of Cerberus' inhibitory functions in the formation of head structures. It quite possibly may be that although Cerberus is necessary for the induction of a head, its inhibitory actions may play a more significant role in ensuring the head is developed properly.

Overexpression or overabundance of Cerberus is associated with the development of ectopic heads. These additional head-like structures may contain varying characteristics of a normal head (eye or eyes, brain, notochord) depending on the ratio of overabundant Cerberus to other proteins associated with anterior development that Cerberus inhibits (Wnt, Nodal, and BMP). If only Nodal is blocked, a single head will still form but with abnormalities such as cyclopia. If both Nodal and BMP or Wnt and BMP are sufficiently inhibited, ectopic, abnormal head-like structures will form. Inhibition of all three proteins by Cerberus is required for the development of complete, ectopic heads.

== Location ==
It is expressed in the anterior endoderm but can vary dorsally and ventrally between species. For example, in amphibians Cerberus is expressed in the anterior dorsal endoderm and in mice it is expressed in the anterior visceral endoderm.

== Anterior-posterior patterning ==
Anterior-posterior patterning by Cerberus is accomplished by acting as an antagonist to nodal, bmp, and wnt signaling molecules in the anterior region of the vertebrate embryo during gastrulation. Knock down experiments in which Cerberus was partially repressed show a decreased formation of the head structures. In experiments where Cerberus was decreased and wnt, bmp and nodal signals were increased, embryos completely lacked head structures and develop only trunk structures. These experiments suggest that a balance of these signaling molecules is required for proper development of the anterior and posterior regions.

== Left-right asymmetry ==
Cerberus is also involved in establishing left-right asymmetry that is critical to the normal physiology of a vertebrate. By blocking nodal in the right side of the embryo, concentrations of nodal remain high only in the left side of the embryo and the nodal cascade cannot be activated in the right side. Because left-right asymmetry is so vital, Cerberus works along with the nodal cilia that push left-determining signal molecules to the left side of the embryo to ensure that the left-right axis is correctly established. Misexpression experiments show that lack of Cerberus expression on the right side can result in situs inversus and cardiovascular malformations.

== Heart development ==
Cerberus plays a vital role in heart development and differentiation of cardiac mesoderm through activation of Nodal signaling molecule. Nodal and Wnt activity is antagonized in the endoderm which results in diffusible signals from Cerberus. More specifically, Nodal inhibits certain cells from joining cardiogenesis while simultaneously activating cells. The cells that respond to Nodal produce Cerberus in the underlying endoderm which causes heart development in adjacent cells. Knockdown experiments of Cerberus reduced endogenous cardiomyogenesis and ectopic heart induction. Block of Nodal leads to induction of cardiogenic genes through chromatin remodeling. The heart is developed asymmetrically using the left-right patterning induced by Cerberus which creates a higher concentration of signaling molecules on the left side. Experiments that inhibited Cerberus led to a loss of left-right polarity of the heart, which was shown by bilateral expression of left side-specific genes.

During mammalian heart induction, a mammalian homologue, Cer1, is associated with the coordinated suppression of the TGFbeta superfamily members Nodal and BMP. This induces Brahma-associated factor 60c (Baf60c), one of three Baf60 variants (a, b, and c) that are mutually exclusively assembled into the SWI/SNF chromatin remodelling complex. Blocking Nodal and BMP also induces lineage-specific transcription factors Gata4 and Tbx5, which interact with Baf60c. Collectively, these proteins redirect SWI/SNF to activate the cardiac program of gene expression. Targeted inactivation of another homologue, Cerberus like-2 (Cerl2), in the mouse leads to left ventricular cardiac hyperplasia and systolic dysfunction.

== Evolutionary role and conservation ==
The Nodal signaling pathway, including Cerberus, is evolutionary conserved. It is theorized that the gut was the first asymmetrical organ to develop, but in modern vertebrates, most internal organs display asymmetry. While the Nodal pathway is found in deuterostomes and protostomes, a proposed common ancestor called Urbilateria has been theorized to be the progenitor of all bilaterally symmetrical animals. The only protostomes to possess Nodal are mollusks (including snails), while the vast majority of deuterostomes possess this signaling pathway. Cerberus is present in the signaling pathway of amphioxus, an early chordate. As a result, it is likely that the majority of vertebrates possess Cerberus or analogous molecules (such as Coco in frogs, Dand5 in mice, and charon in zebrafish). Notably, chickens lack the ciliary dependent mechanisms of Nodal distribution, but Nodal and Cerberus are still an integral part of their asymmetrical L-R development. Pigs also lack this ciliary mechanism, but both species rely on an ion pump to accomplish L-R distribution of Nodal. Cerberus's (and analogous molecules') role in this pathway is to bind to Nodal in an inhibitory manner.
