= Gastruloid =

Embryonic Stem Cells

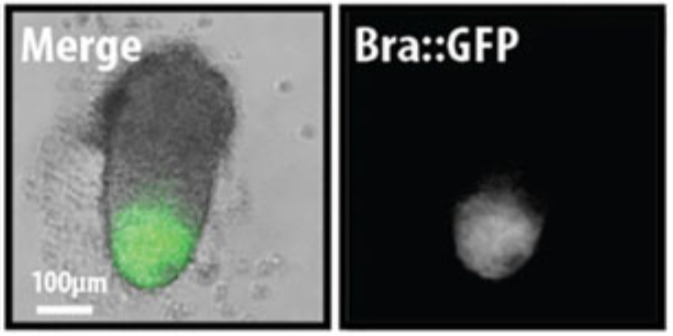
An example of a Gastruloid formed from Brachyury::GFP mouse ESCs, treated with a pulse of the Wnt/β-Catenin agonist CHIR99021 between 48 and 72h and imaged by wide-field fluorescence microscopy at 120h. Notice the polarised expression of Brachyury::GFP (Bra) at the elongating tip of the Gastruloid. Image from van den Brink et al. (2014), used with CC-BY licence.

Gastruloids are three dimensional aggregates of embryonic stem cells (ESCs) that, under appropriate culture conditions, develop an embryo-like organization with three orthogonal axes and a precise distribution of the primordia for multiple derivatives of the three germ layers in the absence of extraembryonic tissues. Significantly, they lack fore- mid- and hindbrain. They are a model system an embryonic organoid for the study of mammalian development (including humans) and disease.

== Background ==
The Gastruloid model system draws its origins from work by Marikawa et al.. In that study, small numbers of mouse P19 embryonal carcinoma (EC) cells, were aggregated as embryoid bodies (EBs) and used to model and investigate the processes involved in anteroposterior polarity and the formation of a primitive streak region. In this work, the EBs were able to organise themselves into structures with polarised gene expression, axial elongation/organisation and up-regulation of posterior mesodermal markers. This was in stark contrast to work using EBs from mouse ESCs, which had shown some polarisation of gene expression in a small number of cases but no further development of the multicellular system.

Following this study, the Martinez Arias laboratory in the Department of Genetics at the University of Cambridge demonstrated how aggregates of mouse embryonic stem cells (ESCs) were able to generate structures that exhibited collective behaviours with striking similarity to those during early development such as symmetry-breaking (in terms of gene expression), axial elongation and germ-layer specification. To quote from the original paper: "Altogether, these observations further emphasize the similarity between the processes that we have uncovered here and the events in the embryo. The movements are related to those of cells in gastrulating embryos and for this reason we term these aggregates 'gastruloids'". As noted by the authors of this protocol, a crucial difference between this culture method and previous work with mouse EBs was the use of small numbers of cells which may be important for generating the correct length scale for patterning, and the use of culture conditions derived from directed differentiation of ESCs in adherent culture

Brachyury (T/Bra), a gene which marks the primitive streak and the site of gastrulation, is up-regulated in the Gastruloids following a pulse of the Wnt/β-Catenin agonist CHIR99021 (Chi; other factors have also been tested) and becomes regionalised to the elongating tip of the Gastruloid. From or near the region expressing T/Bra, cells expressing the mesodermal marker tbx6 are extruded from the similar to cells in the gastrulating embryo; it is for this reason that these structures are called Gastruloids.

Further studies revealed that the events that specify T/Bra expression in gastruloids mimic those in the embryo. After seven days gastruloids exhibit an organization very similar to a midgestation embryo with spatially organized primordia for all mesodermal (axial, paraxial, intermediate, cardiac, cranial and hematopoietic) and endodermal derivatives as well as the spinal cord. They also implement Hox gene expression with the spatiotemporal coordinates as the embryo. Gastruloids lack brain as well as extraembryonic tissues but characterisation of the cellular complexity of gastruloids at the level of single cell and spatial transcriptomics, reveals that they contain representatives of the three germ layers including neural crest, Primordial Germ cells and placodal primordia.

A feature of gastruloids is a disconnect between the transcriptional programs and outlines and the morphogenesis. However, changes in the culture conditions can elicit morphogenesis, most significantly gastruloids have been shown to form somites and early cardiac structures. In addition, interactions between gastruloids and extraembryonic tissues promote an anterior, brain-like polarised tissue.

Gastruloids have recently been obtained from human ESCs, which gives developmental biologists the ability to study early human development without needing human embryos. Importantly though, the human gastruloid model is not able to form a human embryo, meaning that is a non-intact, non-viable and non-equivalent to in vivo human embryos.

The term Gastruloid has been expanded to include self-organised human embryonic stem cell arrangements on patterned (micro patterns) that mimic early patterning events in development; these arrangements should be referred to as 2D gastruloids.
