= Nodal signaling pathway =

Cellular process in embryonic development

The Nodal signaling pathway is a signal transduction pathway important in regional and cellular differentiation during embryonic development.

The Nodal family of proteins, a subset of the transforming growth factor beta (TGFβ) superfamily, is responsible for mesoendoderm induction, patterning of the nervous system, and determination of dorsal- ventral axis in vertebrate embryos. Activation of the Nodal pathway involves nodal binding to activin and activin-like receptors which leads to phosphorylation of the Smad2. The P-Smad2/Smad4 complex translocates into the nucleus to interact with transcription factors such as FoxH1, p53 and Mixer (Xenopus mix-like endodermal regulator). This will, in turn, lead to induction of target genes such as NODAL, Lefty, the antagonist of nodal cerberus, and others.

The activation of the Nodal pathway induces the transcription of many target genes including of its own, but at the same time, micro-RNAs and other proteins interfere with this positive feedback loop in a negative manner at different points of the pathway. This balance of activation and inhibition of the signal is necessary to achieve the precise location, concentration and duration of downstream target genes that have an important role early in development. This article will summarize the role of some of the components that participate positively and negatively in regulation the signaling pathway. Although all the major components of Nodal signaling are evolutionarily conserved in almost all vertebrates, the regulation of each component of the pathway sometimes varies according to the species.

== History ==
The nodal gene was originally discovered by Conlon et al. by retroviral mutation in mice which led to the isolation of a gene that interfered with normal mouse gastrulation and embryo development. Further study of this gene by Zhou et al. showed that the nodal genes encode a secreted signaling peptide that was sufficient to induce mesoderm cells in the mouse embryo. This was an important finding as many other factors had been implicated in the formation of mesoderm in Xenopus whereas the difficulty of removal of these factors due to embryonic lethality and maternal contribution of genes had kept the ability to assay the knock out phenotypes elusive. Further studies of nodal signaling in other vertebrates such as Cyclops and Squint in zebrafish proved that nodal signaling is adequate to induce mesoderm in all vertebrates.

== Selected components of the pathway ==
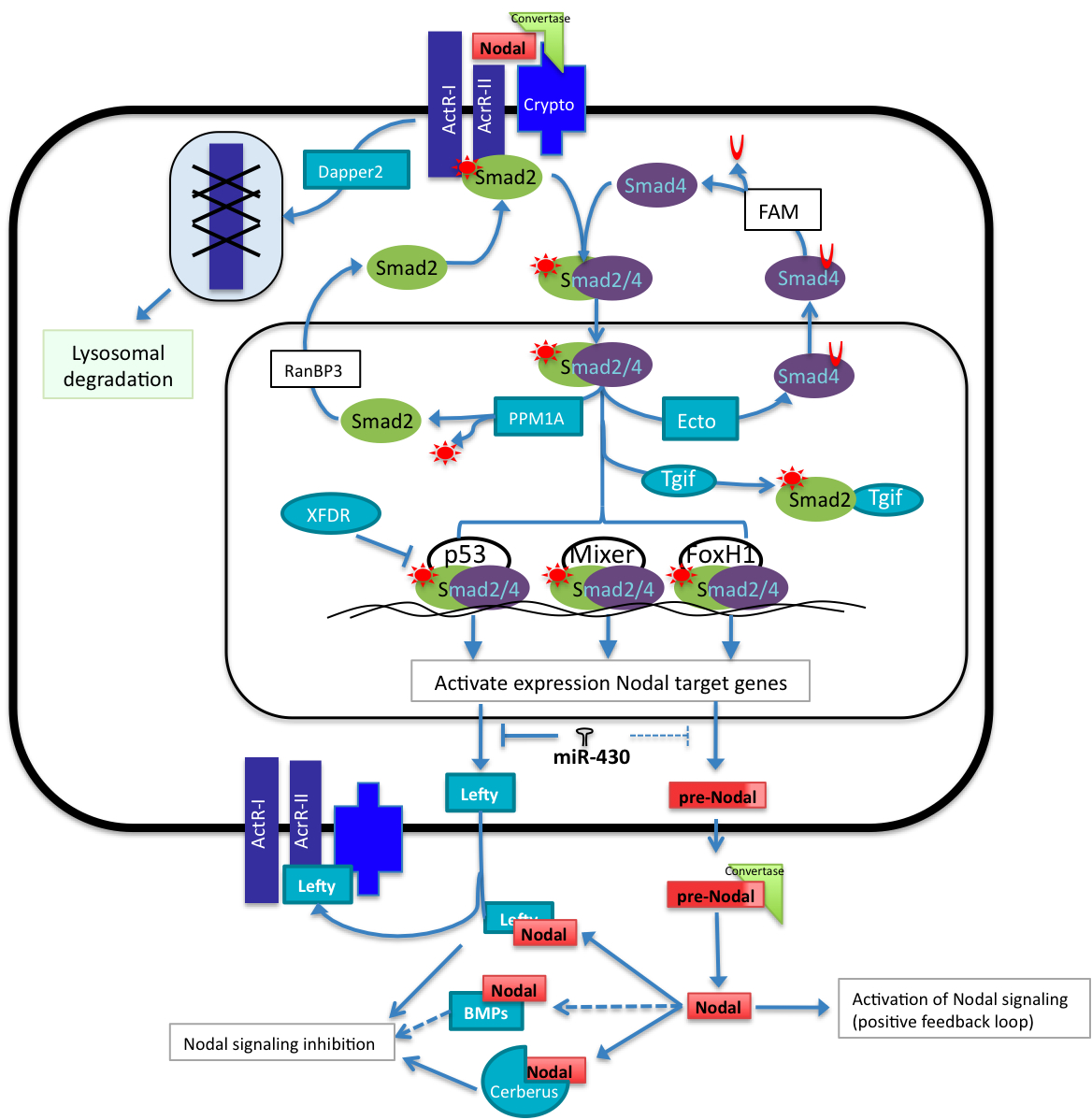
Overview of Nodal signaling pathway. Nodal and its repressor Lefty are both expressed in response to Nodal signaling. The protein expression levels are affected due to the activity of the miR-430 super-family. Once the protein is translated, it has to be processed in the extracellular space by Convertases (Furin and PACE4). Mature Nodal binds to the Activin receptors I and II and the co-receptor Cripto/Criptic and phosphorilates Smad2 /3. These Smads form a complex with Smad4 and enter into the nucleus and with the help of p53, Mixer or FoxH1 activate the transcription of genes involved in mesoderm and endoderm induction. Ectodermin, PPM1A, XFDR and Tgf1 negative regulate the pathway by competing with Smad components or transcription factors. The interaction of Nodal with BMPs (BMP3, BMP7), Lefty or with Cerberus in the outside of the cells affects its capability to bind to the receptors and reactivate the signal.

=== Lefty ===
The Lefty proteins, divergent members of the TGFβ superfamily of proteins, act as extracellular antagonists of Nodal signaling. Expression studies of the Lefty homologue, antivin, in zebrafish show that Lefty likely acts as a competitive inhibitor of Nodal signaling. Overexpression of Lefty leads to a phenotype similar to a Nodal knockout while overexpression of the activin (nodal-related protein) receptor or even the receptor extracellular domain can rescue the phenotype. As the induction of Lefty is dependent upon Nodal expression, lefty acts a classic feedback inhibitor for Nodal signaling. Like nodals, all vertebrates have at least one Lefty gene while many, such as zebrafish and mouse, have two unique Lefty genes.

=== DAN proteins ===
DAN proteins, such as Cerberus and Coco in Xenopus and Cerberus-like in mouse, also act as antagonists of Nodal signaling. Unlike Lefty proteins, DAN proteins bind directly to extracellular Nodal proteins and prevent signaling. Further, not all DAN proteins are specific to Nodal signaling and will also block bone morphogenetic proteins (BMPs) and, in the case of Cerberus and Coco, Wnt signaling as well. This activity is important in neural development and left-right symmetry as will be discussed later.

=== BMPs ===
Lefty and Cerberus are not the only ones to be able to interact in the extracellular space with Nodal, there is biochemical evidence that BMP3 and BMP7 form heterodimers with Nodal, causing mutual inhibition of the involved pathways.

=== Convertases: Furin and PACE4 ===
Nodal mRNA produces an immature protein form of Nodal that is cleaved by proteins called convertases in order to generate a mature Nodal. The subtilisin-like proprotein convertases (SPC) Furin (Spc1) and PACE4 (Spc4) recognize a specific sequence of the precursor of Nodal protein and cleaves it to form the mature Nodal ligand. Conversely, the immature form of Nodal is still capable to activate the pathway. During Nodal transportation to the extracellular space, the Nodal co-receptor captures the Nodal precursor in lipid rafts and once in the cell surface, Cripto interacts with the convertases and forms a complex that facilitates the processing of Nodal.

=== EGF-CFC proteins ===
EGF-CFC proteins are membrane bound extracellular factors that serve as essential cofactor in Nodal signaling and in vertebrate development as a whole. This family of cofactors includes One-eyed Pinhead (oep) in Zebrafish, FRL1 in Xenopus, and Cripto and Criptic in mouse and human. Genetic studies of oep in zebrafish have shown that the knockout of both maternal and zygotic oep leads to a phenotype similar to that of the squint/Cyclops (Nodals) knockout. Similarly, over-expression of either the Nodal (squint/Cyclops) or oep with the knockout of the other does not show phenotypical differences. This evidence coupled with the data that overexpression of oep shows no phenotype corroborates the role of EGF-CFC as an essential cofactor in Nodal signaling.

=== Dapper2 ===
In mouse, frog and fish, Dapper2, is a negative regulator of mesoderm formation acting through the down-regulation of the Wnt and TGFβ / nodal signaling pathways. In zebrafish, nodal is known to activate the gene expression of dapper2. In the cell surface Dapper2 tightly binds to the active form of the activin type 1 receptors and targets the receptor for lysosomal degradation. Dapper2 overexpression mimics nodal co-receptor loss of function because nodal signal cannot be transduced and therefore it produces less mesoderm. In the mouse embryo, dpr2 mRNA is located across all the embryo 7.5 days post conception (dpc) however its location changes at 8.5-dpc where it is observed at the prospective somites and by 10-dpc, neural tube, otic vesicle and gut; because Dapper2 and Nodal are expressed in the same region, this suggests that Dapper antagonizes mesoderm induction signals derived from Nodal. Somehow the reduction of activin receptors would lead to the decrease in activity of different TGFb pathways.

=== Smad ===
Smad proteins are responsible for transducing nodal signals into the nucleus. The binding of Nodal proteins to activin or activin-like serine/threonine kinase receptors results in the phosphorylation of Smad2. Smad2 will then associate with Smad4 and translocate into the nucleus thereby stimulating transcription of nodal target genes. Evidence has been shown that another Smad, Smad3, can be phosphorylated by activated receptors and may also function as an activator of nodal genes. However, knockout of Smad2 in mice leads to disruption of the formation of the primitive streak. This is not sufficient to knockdown all mesoendodermal genes showing that Smad3 has some overlapping function with Smad2. However, the expression of these genes is ubiquitous in Smad2 KO embryos whereas it is limited in the wild type. Smad3 knockouts do not have a phenotype showing that expression overlap with Smad2 is sufficient normal development.

==== Molecules affecting nodal activation via smad ====
Ectodermin negatively regulates the nodal pathway by inhibiting the interaction of Smad4 with other Smads inside the nucleus via the mono-ubiquitination Smad4, this modification allow it to be transported out of the cytoplasm where it can be deubiquitinated by FAM protein, allowing it to form complexes again with other Smads. Another negative regulator of the pathway intervening with Smads is PPM1A, a phosphatase that acts with Phospho-Smad2/3 making it inactive. Subsequently, Smad2/3 is transported outside the nucleus with the help of RanBP2.

=== Transcriptional factors controlling signaling ===
Smad2/3/4 can associate to different transcription factors such as p53, Mixer and FoxH1 and recognize specific cis-regulatory elements to activate the expression of Nodal target genes at a precise time and location and activate genes required for mesoderm induction. There are some other transcription factors that compete for some of the components of the transcriptional machinery for the activation of Nodal target genes. For instance, Tgif1 and Tgif2 are negative co-regulators that compete for the active form of Smad2, reducing the relative concentration of active Smad2 in the nucleus. In Xenopus, the loss-of-function of Tgf1 and Tgf2 causes the up-regulation of Xnr5 and Xnr6. Another example of transcriptional repressors in frog is XFDL, that binds to p53 obstructing the interaction with the Smad2/3/4 complex.

=== miRNAs controlling signaling ===
In vertebrates, the evolutionary conserved family of microRNAs miR-430/427/302 is expressed early in development. It has important roles in controlling mesoderm and endoderm specification, and it does it by regulating the protein expression levels of some Nodal signaling components. This family is composed by the teleost miR-430, the amphibian miR-427 and the mammalian miR-302. In zebra fish the miR-430 inhibits translation of Sqt, Lefty1 and Lefty2, in frogs miR-427 regulate Xnr5, Xnr6b, LeftyA and LeftyB, however in humans embryonic stem cells it has been shown that miR-302 negative regulates the expression of only Lefty1 and Lefty2 but it does not seem down-regulate Nodal protein expression levels.

== Nodal signaling in development ==
=== Mesoendoderm Induction ===
Multiple studies have established that Nodal signal is required for the induction of most mesodermal and endodermal cell types and Squint/Cyclops knockouts in Zebrafish do not develop notochord, heart, kidneys or even blood. The origin and expression pattern of the nodal signaling proteins differs in different species. Mammalian nodal signaling is initiated ubiquitously in epiblast cells and is maintained by autoregulatory signaling of Wnt3 and limited by the induction of antagonists such as Cerberus-like and lefty. Studies in Xenopus have found that xnr expression (the Xenopus nodal) is induced by VegT at the vegetal pole and nodals spread to the blastula. Xnr expression is stabilized by the presence of β-catenin. This information raises the question of how nodal signaling leads to the induction of both endoderm and mesoderm. The answer comes in form of a gradient of nodal protein. Temporal and spatial differences in nodal signaling will result in different cell fates. With the addition of antagonists and variable range of different nodals, a map of cell fates including both mesoderm and endoderm can be drawn for the embryo. However, it is unclear whether nodal signaling is summated or if cells respond to the amplitude of the signal.

=== Left-Right Patterning ===
Human anatomy is asymmetric with the heart located on the left side and the liver on the right. Left-right asymmetry (biology) is a feature common to all vertebrates and even paired-symmetric organs such as lungs display asymmetries in the number of lobes. Evidence that nodal signaling is responsible for left-right specification comes from genetic analysis of organisms deficient in left-right specification. These genetic studies led to identification of mutations in components in the nodal signaling pathway such as ActRIIB, Criptic, and FoxH1 in mouse. These studies found that the left-right symmetry is created as a result of nodal antagonist expression on the right side of the embryo which is balanced by nodal upregulating itself on the other half of the embryo. The result is a nodal gradient that is high on the ventral side of the embryo and, through antagonist action, declines as a gradient to the midline. Studies on the nodal signaling pathway and its downstream targets such as PITX2 in other animals have shown it may also control left-right asymmetric patterning in sea squirt, amphioxus, sea urchin and mollusc lineages.

=== Neural patterning ===
As nodal signaling give rise to ectoderm and mesoderm, neuroectoderm formation requires blocking nodal signaling which is accomplished by the expression of nodal antagonist, Cerberus. The role of nodal signaling reemerges later in development when nodal signaling is required to specify ventral cell neural patterning. Loss of function of Cyclops or oep in zebrafish results in cyclopic embryos characterized by a lack of medial floor plate and ventral forebrain. Not all nodals result in the formation of mesoectoderm. Xenopus nodal related 3, (Xnr3) a divergent member of the TGFβ superfamily, induces the expression of the protein, Xbra. The Xbra expression pattern, in correlation the expression pattern another neuroinducer, Xlim-1, result in the patterning of the organizer in Xenopus. This signaling in conjuncture with other nodals, noggin, chordin, follistatin and others results in the final patterning of vertebrate central nervous system.
