= Left-right determination factor 1 =

Protein found in humans

LEFTY1

Identifiers
- Aliases: LEFTY1, LEFTB, LEFTYB, left-right determination factor 1
- External IDs: OMIM: 603037; MGI: 107405; GeneCards: LEFTY1

Gene location (Human)
Chr.	Chromosome 1 (human)
Band	1q42.12	Start	225,886,282 bp
Band	1q42.12	End	225,911,382 bp

Gene location (Mouse)
Chr.	Chromosome 1 (mouse)
Band	1|1 H4	Start	180,762,587 bp
Band	1|1 H4	End	180,765,965 bp
RNA expression pattern
Bgee	Human / Mouse (ortholog); Top expressed in: mucosa of transverse colon; body of pancreas; rectum; testicle; gonad; endometrium; appendix; epithelium of colon; monocyte; cerebellar hemisphere / Top expressed in: neural plate; lateral plate mesoderm; primitive endoderm; Region I of hippocampus proper; endothelial cell of lymphatic vessel; lip; ankle joint; embryo; islet of Langerhans; skin of external ear; More reference expression data
BioGPS	n/a
Gene ontology
Molecular function	transforming growth factor beta receptor binding; cytokine activity; growth factor activity
Cellular component	extracellular region; extracellular space
Biological process	regulation of apoptotic process; multicellular organism development; positive regulation of pathway-restricted SMAD protein phosphorylation; heart morphogenesis; determination of left/right symmetry; negative regulation of transcription by RNA polymerase II; transforming growth factor beta receptor signaling pathway; regulation of MAPK cascade; SMAD protein signal transduction; cell development; BMP signaling pathway; regulation of signaling receptor activity
Sources:Amigo / QuickGO
Orthologs
Databases	NCBI: entry; OMA: entry
Species	Human	Mouse
Entrez	10637	13590
Ensembl	ENSG00000243709	ENSMUSG00000038793
UniProt	O75610	Q64280
RefSeq (mRNA)	NM_020997	NM_010094
RefSeq (protein)	NP_066277	NP_034224
Location (UCSC)	Chr 1: 225.89 – 225.91 Mb	Chr 1: 180.76 – 180.77 Mb
PubMed search
- Wikidata
View/Edit Human	View/Edit Mouse

Left-right determination factor 1 is a protein that in humans is encoded by the LEFTY1 gene.

== Function ==
This gene encodes a member of the TGF-beta family of proteins. A similar secreted protein in mouse plays a role in left-right asymmetry determination of organ systems during development. Alternative processing of this protein can yield three different products. This gene is closely linked to both a related family member and a related pseudogene.

== See also ==
- Lefty
  - Lefty-1
