= Lefty (protein) =

Members of the TGF-beta superfamily of growth factors

left-right determination factor 1

Identifiers
- Symbol: LEFTY1
- Alt. symbols: LEFTB
- NCBI gene: 10637
- HGNC: 6552
- OMIM: 603037
- RefSeq: NM_020997
- UniProt: O75610

Other data
- Locus: Chr. 1 q42.1
Search for
- Structures: Swiss-model
- Domains: InterPro

left-right determination factor 2

Identifiers
- Symbol: LEFTY2
- Alt. symbols: TGFB4, EBAF
- NCBI gene: 7044
- HGNC: 3122
- OMIM: 601877
- RefSeq: NM_003240
- UniProt: O00292

Other data
- Locus: Chr. 1 q42.1
Search for
- Structures: Swiss-model
- Domains: InterPro

Lefty (left-right determination factors) are a class of proteins that are closely related members of the TGF-beta superfamily of growth factors. These proteins are secreted and play a role in left-right asymmetry determination of organ systems during development. Mutations of the genes encoding these proteins have been associated with left-right axis malformations, particularly in the heart and lungs.

== History ==
Lefty, a divergent member of the transforming growth factor-β (TGF beta) superfamily of proteins, was originally discovered in the Hamada lab at the Osaka University using deletion screening of cDNA libraries in P19 embryonic carcinoma cells to find clones that did not differentiate when induced to differentiate using retinoic acid. From these screens, researchers found one gene that was a tentative member of the TGF-beta superfamily that was predominantly expressed on the left side the embryo and aptly named it lefty. Like other members of the TGF-beta superfamily, lefty is synthesized as a preproprotein, meaning that the protein is proteolytically cleaved and excreted to produce the active form of the protein. However, lefty has only 20-25% sequence similarity with other members of the TGF-beta superfamily. Lefty is conserved in all vertebrates and many species have more than one homologue. Humans and mice, for instance have two homologues, Lefty 1 and Lefty 2, whose differential expression leads to distinct purposes while the mechanism of action is conserved.

== Function ==
A simplified depiction of the gradients of nodal and lefty in the mouse embryo.

Lefty proteins function as an antagonist of the Nodal Signaling pathway. Nodal is another signaling protein which is responsible for gastrulation, left-right patterning and induction of the primitive node. As NODAL protein diffuse through an embryo, it triggers Nodal Signaling within tissues with the required receptors and coreceptors. Activated nodal signaling leads to the transcription of the lefty gene. The protein is then expressed, proteolytically cleaved, and finally secreted. Secreted lefty binds to EGF-CFC proteins like one-eyed pinhead in zebrafish keeping the essential cofactor from associating with NODAL/ Activin-like receptor complex. This will effectually block Nodal Signaling. During induction of the primitive streak, lefty confines Nodal activity to the posterior end of the embryo, establishing a posterior signaling center and inducing the formation of the primitive streak and mesoderm. (See Nodal Signaling or TGF beta signaling pathway for more information on the nodal signaling pathway.)

There are many differences between the left and right sides, including heart and lung positioning. Mutations in these genes cause incorrect positioning of these organs (e.g., situs inversus), or in the case of constitutively inactive lefty, the embryo becomes entirely mesoderm and fails to pattern or develop. During vertebrate development, lefty proteins regulate left-right asymmetry by controlling the spatiotemporal influence of the NODAL protein. Lefty1 in the ventral midline prevents the Cerberus (paracrine factor or "Caronte") signal from passing to the right side of the embryo. This spatiotemporal control is achieved by using two sources of excreted lefty. While lefty is produced in response to activated nodal signaling, it is also produced and secreted in the anterior visceral endoderm (AVE). The balance of lefty from the AVE and from Nodal Signaling results in the patterning of the embryo and left-right asymmetry.

== Clinical significance ==
Proper functioning of Lefty is crucial to the proper development of the heart, lungs, spleen, and liver. Mutations in Lefty2 have been associated with left-right patterning defects and in particular a condition called heterotaxy. This is associated with congenital heart defects due to malformation, interrupted inferior vena cava, and lack of lung asymmetry (left pulmonary isomerism). Lefty2 may play a role in endometrial bleeding.

== Lefty-1 ==
Lefty-1 is a regulatory gene that plays a vital role in the determination of the left-right internal asymmetry observed in mammals. The lefty-1 protein works in tandem with two other genes: lefty-2 and nodal. As the primitive node migrates towards the cranial end of the embryo during development, its cilia preferentially sling lefty-2 and nodal towards the left side of the embryo. These two genes encode for "leftness", and initiate the formation of the heart, spleen, and other internal organs that are found on the left side in a typical human being. Lefty-1 protein can be viewed as a barrier between the left and right portions of the embryo that prevents the diffusion of lefty-2 and nodal to the right side. This ensures that the left-determining molecules are confined to their correct developmental domain. A variety of defects were observed in mice that had lefty-1 deleted, including left pulmonary isomerism, situs inversus, and atrial septal defect ^{[2]}. The high incidence of left pulmonary isomerism in the knockout mice indicates that lefty-1 itself is not involved in encoding for leftness, but simply ensures the correct compartmentation of the left-determining molecules. In the absence of the lefty-1 barrier, lefty-2 and nodal are free to diffuse to the right side and initiate the development of a left lung that was meant to be limited to the left side of the thoracic cavity.
