= Subinvolution =

Medical condition after childbirth

Subinvolution is a medical condition in which after childbirth, the uterus does not return to its normal size.

== Presentation ==
=== Symptoms ===
The condition may be asymptomatic. The predominant symptoms are:

- Abnormal lochial discharge, either excessive or prolonged
- Irregular or at times excessive uterine bleeding
- Irregular cramp-like pain is cases of retained products or rise of temperature in sepsis

=== Signs ===
1. The uterine height is greater than the normal for the particular day of puerperium. Normal puerperal uterus may be displaced by a full bladder or a loaded rectum. It feels boggy and softer upon palpation.
2. The presence of features responsible for subinvolution may be evident.

== Causes ==
=== Predisposing factors ===
1. Grand multiparity
2. Overdistension of the uterus as in twins and hydramnios
3. Ill maternal health
4. Caesarean section
5. Uterine prolapse
6. Retroversion after the uterus becomes a pelvic organ
7. Uterine fibroid

=== Aggravating factors ===
- Retained products of conception
- Uterine sepsis, endometritis

== Factors ==
- Persistent lochia/fresh bleeding
- Long labor
- Anesthesia
- Full bladder
- Difficult delivery
- Retained placenta
- Maternal infection

== Diagnosis ==
=== Definition ===
When the involution is impaired or retarded it is called subinvolution. The uterus is the most common organ affected by subinvolution. As it is the most accessible organ to be measured per abdomen, the uterine involution is considered clinically as an index to assess subinvolution.

== Management ==
- Antibiotics in endometritis
- Exploration of the uterus in retained products
- Pessary in prolapse or retroversion.
- Ergometrine, often prescribed to enhance the involution process by reducing the blood flow of the uterus is of no value in prophylaxis.
