= Xbra =

Homologue of Brachyury (T) gene for Xenopus

Xbra is a homologue of Brachyury (T) gene for Xenopus. It is a transcription activator involved in vertebrate gastrulation which controls posterior mesoderm patterning and notochord differentiation by activating transcription of genes expressed throughout mesoderm. The effects of Xbra is concentration dependent where concentration gradient controls the development of specific types of mesoderm in Xenopus. Xbra results of the expression of the FGF transcription factor, synthesized by the ventral endoderm. So while ventral mesoderm is characterized by a high concentration of FGF and Xbra, the dorsal mesoderm is characterized by a reunion of two others transcription factors, Siamois and XnR, which activates the synthesis of Goosecoid Transcription Factor. Goosecoid enables the depletion of Xbra. In a nutshell, high concentrations of Xbra induce ventral mesoderm while low concentration stimulates the formation of a back.

Posterior mesoderm development presents two types of cell behaviors, cell migration and convergent extension, in prechordal mesoderm and chordamesoderm cells, respectively. Cell migration is exhibited by the prechordal mesoderm cells, resulting in the formation of the future anterior end. Xbra induces convergent extension which inhibits cell migration and rearranges the chordamesoderm cells into a structure that will later differentiate into notochord. As a result, Xbra acts as a switch to convert between these two behaviors.

Xbra is able to activate itself indirectly, specifically for dorsal mesoderm, through FGF signaling while eFGF maintains Xbra expression, creating an autoregulatory loop.

Inhibition of Xbra leads to abnormal patterning of mesoderm, such as shortened trunk. In a previous study, the activation domain of Xbra was replaced by repressor domain of Drosophila engrailed protein in order to form a dominant-interfering Xbra construct that would help to study the function and regulation of Xbra. The injection of RNA encoding this construct has led to various birth defects such as defective blastopore closure and abnormal notochord differentiation in the developing embryo.
