= Sea urchin skeletogenesis =

Embryonic developmental stage of the sea urchin

Skeletogenesis is a key morphogenetic event in the embryonic development of vertebrates and is of equal, although transient, importance in the development of the sea urchin, a marine invertebrate. The larval sea urchin does not resemble its adult form, because the sea urchin is an indirect developer, meaning its larva form must undergo metamorphosis to form the juvenile adult. Here, the focus is on skeletogenesis in the sea urchin species Strongylocentrotus purpuratus, as this species has been most thoroughly studied and characterized.

== Morphological changes ==
Skeletogenesis begins in the early sea urchin blastula (9–10 hours post fertilization) when the primary mesenchyme cells (PMCs), the sole descendants of the large micromere daughter cells, undergo an epithelial–mesenchymal transition (EMT) and break away from the apical layer, thus entering the blastocoel, forming a cell cluster at the vegetal pole. It is a key interaction between the two principal populations of mesodermal cells in the sea urchin embryo, PMCs and secondary mesenchyme cells (SMCs), that regulates SMC fates and the process of skeletogenesis. In a wild type embryo, skeletal elements are exclusively produced by PMCs. Due to their nature in giving rise to the larval skeleton, they are sometimes called the skeletogenic mesenchyme. Certain SMCs have a skeletogenic potential, however, signals transmitted by the PMCs suppress this potential in the SMCs and direct these cells into alternative developmental pathways.

Once in the blastocoel, the mesenchyme cells extend and contract long, thin processes called filopodia. The filopodia are 250 nm in diameter and 25 um long. At this point, the filopodia appear to move randomly along the surface of the inner blastocoel, making and breaking filopodial connections to the blastocoel wall. During the gastrula stage, once the blastopore has formed, the PMCs are localized within the prospective ventrolateral (from front to side) region of the blastocoel. It is here that they fuse into syncytial cables, forming the axis for the calcium carbonate (CaCO_{3}) (and a small amount, 5%, of MgCO_{3}) spicules of the larval skeletal rods, 13.5 hours post fertilization. Both optical birefringence and X-ray diffraction indicated that the spicules are crystalline. Upon reaching the pluteus stage (24 hours post fertilization), an abundance of extracellular matrix is also found associated with the syncytia and blastocoel wall. From gastrula to pluteus stages the skeleton grows in both size and complexity. Once the organism undergoes metamorphosis to form the juvenile sea urchin, the larval skeleton is “lost”, making its existence critical yet seemingly transient in the overall life cycle of the sea urchin. The skeleton of the pluteus does, however, give rise to the spines of the juvenile sea urchin. These spines usually measure 1-3 centimeters in length and 1-2 millimeters thick, and in some species, may be poisonous.

== Molecular regulation ==
The molecular mechanisms of skeletogenesis involve several PMC-specific gene products. These include Msp30, a sulfate cell-surface glycoprotein which has been implicated in calcium uptake and deposition, and SM50, SM30, and PM27 which are three proteins of the spicule matrix. SM50 and PM27 are thought to be structurally similar, nonglycosylated, basic proteins whereas SM30 is an acidic glycoprotein. The specific roles of these matrix proteins has yet to be fully elucidated, but it is thought that they may function in the nucleation or orientation of crystal growth. It has also been found that the msp130 gene exhibits a complex pattern of spatial regulation within the PMC syncytium during skeletogenesis. It is suggested that the ectoderm may play a role in controlling skeletal morphogenesis by regulating the expression of PMC-specific gene products involved in spicule biogenesis.

== Evolution ==
The extent to which the molecular mechanisms underlying skeletogenesis in larval sea urchins has been characterized has led to comparative evolutionary developmental studies in distantly-related sea urchins, as well as other echinoderms, with the aim of understanding how this character has evolved. These studies, and others, have revealed that numerous differences have arisen during the evolution of the sea urchin clade in spatiotemporal gene expression of several transcription factors comprising the gene regulatory network driving skeletogenic specification. However, there are also striking similarities in the signaling systems that position these cells in the embryo. Despite differences in timing of mesodermal ingression into the blastocoel and spatiotemporal differences in transcription factor gene expression, ancestral state reconstruction of genes critical to the specification of sea urchin skeletogenic cells supports the homology of this cell type, suggesting it arose some time before the divergence of cidaroids and euechinoids over 268 million years ago.
