= Alfonso Martinez-Fonts Jr. =

American politician (born 1949)

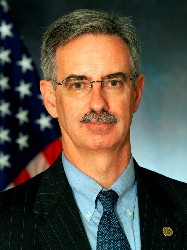

Assistant Secretary for the Private Sector Office Department of Homeland Security
- In office November 27, 2005 – April 1, 2009

Personal details
- Born: November 19, 1949 (age 76) Havana, Cuba
- Spouse: Current: Raquel Martinez-Fonts Previous: Christine Martinez-Fonts (Deceased)
- Education: Villanova University; Long Island University

Alfonso "Al" Martinez-Fonts Jr. is a businessperson who was the assistant secretary for the Private Sector Office at the United States Department of Homeland Security from November 2005 until April 2009, and former executive vice president of the nonprofit U.S. Chamber of Commerce foundation from October 2010 to December 2014.

Martinez-Fonts was responsible for the Private Sector Office, which provides a link between the Department of Homeland Security and the private sector of the United States.

After Martinez-Fonts left the public sector in April 2009, he founded Al Martinez-Fonts, LLC, a consulting company.

Prior to serving in the government, Martinez-Fonts was the chairman and chief executive officer for JP Morgan Chase in El Paso, Texas. Prior to this position, he was the president of a bank in San Antonio, Texas, and served as the chairman of the board of the San Antonio Chamber of Commerce in 1993. After his El Paso position he was a senior executive for Chase Bank of Texas in Houston.

Martinez-Fonts received his bachelor's degree from Villanova University in political science in 1971, and a Master of Business Administration from Long Island University focusing in finance, in 1974.

Martinez-Fonts was previously married to Christine Martinez-Fonts before she died in 2010. They have three children. He currently is married to his wife Raquel.
