= Left-right determination factor 2 =

Protein found in humans

LEFTY2

Identifiers
- Aliases: LEFTY2, EBAF, LEFTA, LEFTYA, TGFB4, left-right determination factor 2
- External IDs: OMIM: 601877; MGI: 2443573; GeneCards: LEFTY2

Gene location (Human)
Chr.	Chromosome 1 (human)
Band	1q42.12	Start	225,936,598 bp
Band	1q42.12	End	225,941,383 bp

Gene location (Mouse)
Chr.	Chromosome 1 (mouse)
Band	1|1 H4	Start	180,720,673 bp
Band	1|1 H4	End	180,726,668 bp
RNA expression pattern
Bgee	Human / Mouse (ortholog); Top expressed in: decidua; body of uterus; Epithelium of choroid plexus; myometrium; sperm; left ovary; canal of the cervix; Descending thoracic aorta; testicle; ascending aorta / Top expressed in: mesoderm; lateral plate mesoderm; embryo; epiblast; Gonadal ridge; embryo; neural plate; primitive streak; inner cell mass; paraxial mesoderm; More reference expression data
BioGPS	n/a
Gene ontology
Molecular function	transforming growth factor beta receptor binding; cytokine activity; growth factor activity
Cellular component	extracellular matrix; extracellular region; platelet alpha granule lumen; extracellular space; collagen-containing extracellular matrix
Biological process	multicellular organism development; regulation of apoptotic process; positive regulation of pathway-restricted SMAD protein phosphorylation; cell growth; platelet degranulation; regulation of MAPK cascade; transforming growth factor beta receptor signaling pathway; SMAD protein signal transduction; cell development; BMP signaling pathway; regulation of signaling receptor activity
Sources:Amigo / QuickGO
Orthologs
Databases	NCBI: entry; OMA: entry
Species	Human	Mouse
Entrez	7044	320202
Ensembl	ENSG00000143768	ENSMUSG00000066652
UniProt	O00292	P57785
RefSeq (mRNA)	NM_001172425; NM_003240	NM_177099
RefSeq (protein)	NP_001165896; NP_003231	NP_796073
Location (UCSC)	Chr 1: 225.94 – 225.94 Mb	Chr 1: 180.72 – 180.73 Mb
PubMed search
- Wikidata
View/Edit Human	View/Edit Mouse

Left-right determination factor 2 (Lefty2) aka TGFB4 is a protein that is encoded by the LEFTY2 gene in humans.

== Function ==
Lefty2 is a protein from the TGF-beta cytokine family of proteins and is sometimes referred to as TGFB-4. It is secreted and plays a role in left-right asymmetry determination of organ systems during development. Mutations in this gene have been associated with left-right axis malformations, particularly in the heart and lungs.

Lefty2 is also sometimes referred to as Endometrial Bleeding-Associated Factor (EBAF). Some types of infertility have been associated with dysregulated expression of this gene in the endometrium and the protein may play a role in endometrial bleeding.

Alternative processing of this protein can yield three different products. This gene is closely linked to both a related family member and a related pseudogene.
