= Alfonso Martínez Arias =

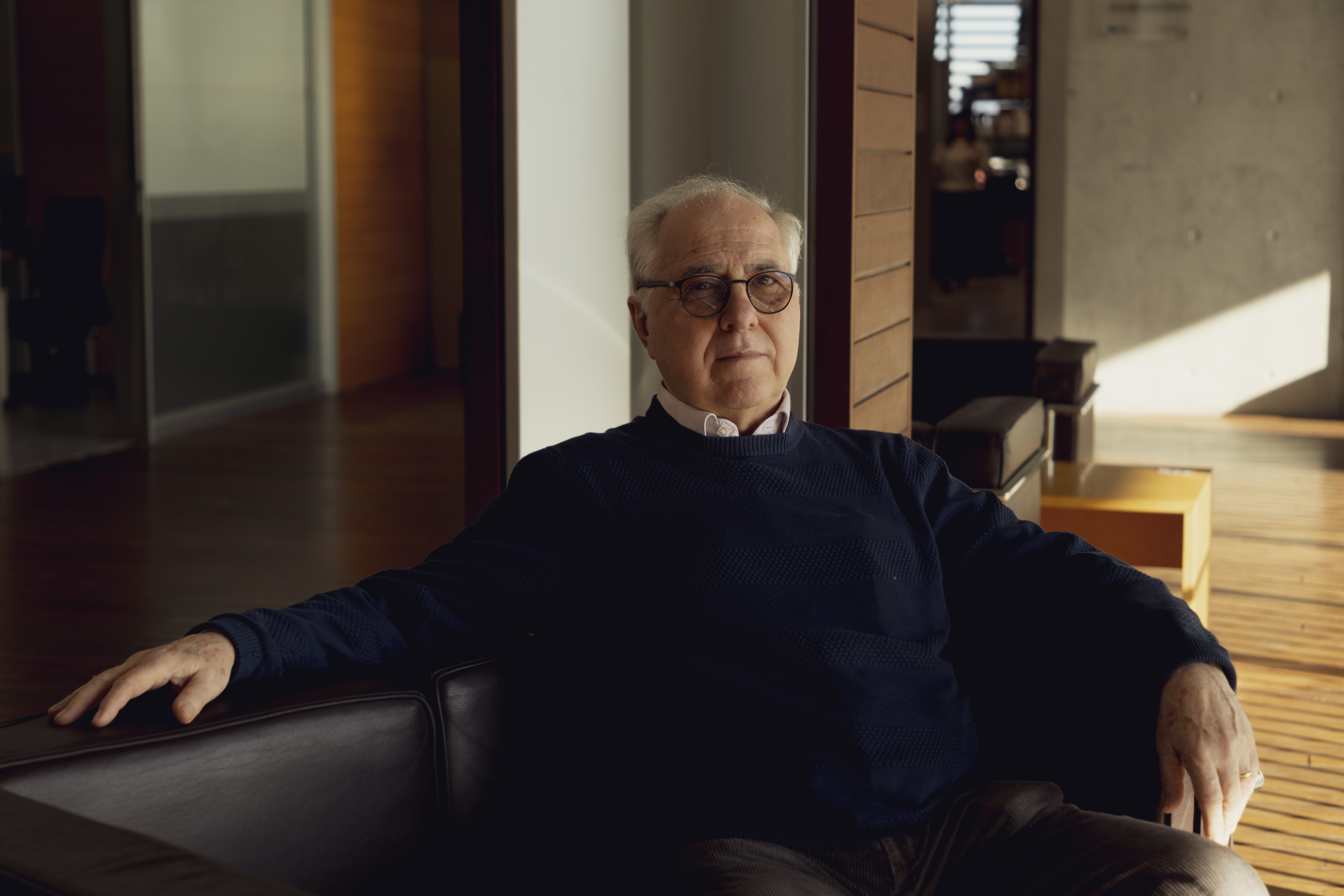
- Born: September 14, 1955 (age 71); Madrid, Spain
- Education: Universidad Complutense de Madrid (BSc); University of Chicago (PhD)
- Occupation: Developmental Biologist
- Organization: Universidad Complutense University of Chicago MRC Lab of molecular biology University of Cambridge Universitat Pompeu Fabra
- Known for: Developmental Biology; Drosophila Genetics; Gastruloids
- Honours: 2012 Waddington Medal of the British Society of Developmental Biology 2007 Elected member of EMBO 2003 Personal Chair (Professorship), University of Cambridge, Cambridge (UK)

Alfonso Martínez Arias is a Spanish and British developmental biologist known by his pioneering development of gastruloids, a stem cell based embryo model for the study of early human development, and his advocacy for the need to look at biology from the perspective of the cell rather than the gene. He is an elected member of the European Molecular Biology Organization and of the Academia Europea and in 2012 was awarded the Waddington Medal of the British Society for Developmental Biology for his contributions to Developmental Biology. Currently, he is an ICREA Emeritus Honorary Professor at the Universitat Pompeu Fabra (UPF) in Barcelona.

== Early life and education ==
Martínez Arias was born in Madrid, Spain. He obtained his undergraduate degree in biology from the Universidad Complutense de Madrid in 1977 and in 1978 moved to the US with a Fulbright fellowship where he completed his PhD in 1983 at the Department of Biophysics and Theoretical Biology of the University of Chicago, Chicago (US) under the supervision of Malcolm Casadaban.

== Academic career ==
After postdoctoral research at the MRC Laboratory of Molecular Biology in Cambridge, United Kingdom, he became a Wellcome Trust Senior Fellow in the Department of Zoology at the University of Cambridge. He later joined the Department of Genetics at Cambridge, where he was appointed professor of developmental mechanics in 2003 and remained until 2021. In 2021 he moved to Barcelona to become an ICREA research professor in the Systems Bioengineering/Experimental and Health Sciences programmes at UPF and the Barcelona Biomedical Research Park (PRBB).

== Research ==
Martínez Arias's research focuses on how a fertilized egg gives rise to an organized organism, with particular emphasis on the early stages of mammalian development. His work has combined drosophila developmental genetics with embryonic stem cell biology to study cell fate heterogeneity, signalling networks, and self‑organization. His laboratory developed “gastruloids”, three‑dimensional aggregates of pluripotent stem cells that recapitulate key features of vertebrate gastrulation and body‑plan formation, providing an in vitro model of early mammalian development in mouse and human. This work is the first example of stem cell based embryo models and Martinez Arias has been very engaged in establishing scientific and ethical standards as well as in guiding the applications of this new field.

In addition to his research publications, Martínez Arias is co‑author of the textbook Molecular Principles of Animal Development and of Principles of Development a widely used developmental biology textbook that has reached its seventh edition and received the Royal Society of Biology book prize.

He is also the author of the popular science book The Master Builder published in 2023, where he argues that to understand life we must put cells, not genes, at the center of biology, that while DNA provides a catalogue of parts, it is cells that interpret this information, interact with each other, and build bodies during development. The book develops a “cell's‑eye view” of organisms and challenges popular “selfish gene” narratives and proposes a new paradigm rooted in cellular cooperation, with implications for how we think about evolution, individuality, development, disease, and the ethical questions raised by embryo and stem‑cell research.

== Awards and honours ==
Martínez Arias was elected a member of the European Molecular Biology Organization (EMBO) in 2007 and of the Academia Europea in 2025. In 2012 he received the Waddington Medal from the British Society for Developmental Biology for his contributions to developmental biology and in 2016 a live achievement award from the Society of Spanish Researchers in the UK

His research has been supported by grants from Advanced Grants from the Wellcome Trust, the European Research Council and the Human Frontier Science Program grant.

== Selected publications ==
- Rivron, N., Martinez Arias, A., Pera, M., Moris, N. and M’Hamdi, HI. (2023) An ethical framework for human embryology with embryo models. Cell 186, 3548-3557.
- Sheng, G., Martinez Arias, A. and Sutherland, A. (2021) The primitive streak and cellular principles of building a body through gastrulation. Science 374 PMID 34855481.
- Moris, N., Anlas, K., van den Brink, S., Alemany, A., Schroeder, J., Gimire, S., Balayo, T., Oudenaarden, A. and Martinez Arias, A. (2020) An embryonic stem cell-based model for early human development. Nature 582, 410-415.
- van den Brink^{,} S., Baillie-Johnson, P., Balayo, T., Hadjantonakis, AK., Nowotschin, S., Turner, DA. And & Martinez Arias, A. (2014) Symmetry breaking, germ layer specification and axial organisation in aggregates of mouse ES cells. Development 141, 4231-4242.
- Mateus, AM, Gorfinkiel, N. and Martinez Arias, A. (2009) Origin and function of fluctuations in cell behaviour and the emergence of pattern. Semin Cell Dev Biol. 20, 877-884.
- Klein, T. and Martinez Arias, A. (1999). The Vestigial gene product provides a molecular context for the interpretation of signals during the development of the wing in Drosophila. Development 126, 913–925
- Kalmar, T., Lim, C., Hayward, P., Muñoz Descalzo, S., Garcia Ojalvo, J. and Martinez Arias, A. (2009) Regulated fluctuations in Nanog expression mediate cell fate decisions in embryonic stem cells. PLoS Biol 7(7): e1000149. doi:10.1371/journal.pbio.1000149
- Martinez Arias, A. and Hayward, P. (2006) Filtering transcriptional noise during development: concepts and mechanisms. Nature Reviews Genetics 7, 34-44.
- Martinez Arias, A., Baker, N. & Ingham, P. (1988). The role of segment polarity genes in the definition and maintenance of cell states in the Drosophila embryo. Development. 103, 157-170.
- Martinez Arias, A. & Lawrence, P. (1985). Parasegments and compartments in the Drosophila embryo. Nature 313, 639-642.
