= Nodal homolog =

Mammalian protein found in Homo sapiens

NODAL

Identifiers
- Aliases: NODAL, HTX5, nodal growth differentiation factor
- External IDs: OMIM: 601265; MGI: 97359; HomoloGene: 8417; GeneCards: NODAL; OMA:NODAL - orthologs
Available structures
PDB	Ortholog search: PDBe RCSB
PDB	List of PDB id codes 4N1D

Gene location (Human)
Chr.	Chromosome 10 (human)
Band	10q22.1	Start	70,431,936 bp
Band	10q22.1	End	70,447,951 bp

Gene location (Mouse)
Chr.	Chromosome 10 (mouse)
Band	10 B4|10 32.21 cM	Start	61,253,751 bp
Band	10 B4|10 32.21 cM	End	61,261,117 bp
RNA expression pattern
Bgee	Human / Mouse (ortholog); Top expressed in: testicle; sperm; oocyte; gastrocnemius muscle; gonad; gastric mucosa; muscle of thigh; retinal pigment epithelium; striated muscle tissue; deltoid muscle / Top expressed in: mesoderm; lateral plate mesoderm; embryonic organizer; primitive endoderm; inner cell mass; embryo; mucous cell of stomach; substantia nigra; internal carotid artery; external carotid artery; More reference expression data
BioGPS	n/a
Gene ontology
Molecular function	receptor ligand activity; cytokine activity; type I activin receptor binding; morphogen activity; transforming growth factor beta receptor binding; growth factor activity
Cellular component	extracellular region; extracellular space
Biological process	trophectodermal cellular morphogenesis; left lung morphogenesis; nodal signaling pathway involved in determination of lateral mesoderm left/right asymmetry; neural fold formation; maternal process involved in parturition; cell fate commitment; endoderm development; transforming growth factor beta receptor signaling pathway involved in primitive streak formation; floor plate morphogenesis; endodermal cell differentiation; epiblast cell-extraembryonic ectoderm cell signaling involved in anterior/posterior axis specification; SMAD protein signal transduction; embryonic pattern specification; polarity specification of proximal/distal axis; positive regulation of nodal signaling pathway involved in determination of lateral mesoderm left/right asymmetry; digestive system development; positive regulation of cell-cell adhesion; lung development; positive regulation of epithelial cell proliferation; placenta development; negative regulation of cell differentiation; positive regulation of pathway-restricted SMAD protein phosphorylation; mesoderm formation; negative regulation of androgen receptor signaling pathway; gastrulation with mouth forming second; anatomical structure formation involved in morphogenesis; positive regulation of DNA-binding transcription factor activity; regulation of stem cell population maintenance; formation of anatomical boundary; embryonic placenta development; in utero embryonic development; negative regulation of transcription by RNA polymerase II; negative regulation of trophoblast cell migration; tissue morphogenesis; BMP signaling pathway; nervous system development; positive regulation of angiogenesis; embryonic heart tube development; nodal signaling pathway; stem cell population maintenance; multicellular organism development; heart looping; embryonic process involved in female pregnancy; development of the heart; positive regulation of cysteine-type endopeptidase activity involved in apoptotic process; brain development; axial mesodermal cell fate specification; vasculature development; positive regulation of activin receptor signaling pathway; determination of left/right symmetry; maternal placenta development; regulation of signal transduction; gastrulation; trophectodermal cell differentiation; mesendoderm development; positive regulation of cell population proliferation; positive regulation of ERK1 and ERK2 cascade; embryonic cranial skeleton morphogenesis; liver development; positive regulation of vascular endothelial growth factor production; cell migration involved in gastrulation; negative regulation of chorionic trophoblast cell proliferation; anterior/posterior axis specification; cell migration; regulation of gastrulation; primitive streak formation; negative regulation of cell development; positive regulation of transcription by RNA polymerase II; digestive tract morphogenesis; positive regulation of SMAD protein signal transduction; anterior/posterior pattern specification; inhibition of neuroepithelial cell differentiation; cell development; regulation of signaling receptor activity; regulation of apoptotic process; regulation of MAPK cascade; signal transduction
Sources:Amigo / QuickGO
Orthologs
Species	Human	Mouse
Entrez	4838	18119
Ensembl	ENSG00000156574	ENSMUSG00000037171
UniProt	Q96S42	P43021
RefSeq (mRNA)	NM_018055; NM_001329906	NM_013611
RefSeq (protein)	NP_001316835; NP_060525	NP_038639
Location (UCSC)	Chr 10: 70.43 – 70.45 Mb	Chr 10: 61.25 – 61.26 Mb
PubMed search
- Wikidata
View/Edit Human	View/Edit Mouse

Nodal homolog is a secretory protein that in humans is encoded by the NODAL gene which is located on chromosome 10q22.1. It belongs to the transforming growth factor beta superfamily (TGF-β superfamily). Like many other members of this superfamily it is involved in cell differentiation in early embryogenesis, playing a key role in signal transfer from the primitive node, in the anterior primitive streak, to lateral plate mesoderm (LPM).

Nodal signaling is important very early in development for mesoderm and endoderm formation and subsequent organization of left-right axial structures. In addition, Nodal seems to have important functions in neural patterning, stem cell maintenance and many other developmental processes, including left/right handedness.

== Nodal induction of gastrulation ==
The primitive node serves as the primary organizer while producing Nodal, which works as the signaling molecule for early embryonic development and gastrulation. Following the formation of the primitive node, secretion of Nodal induces local cell migration. Secondary signals such as DKK1 enable migration through upregulating or downregulating cell adhesion molecules, thereby allowing movement and association with like cells.

First, cranially or anteriorly, anterior visceral endoderm (AVE) develops as the first wave of Nodal induces migration of visceral endoderm relative to the primitive node. AVE begins secreting inhibitory factors such as Lefty quickly following Nodal expression and works to inhibit Nodal and establish anterior-posterior axis patterning.

As the primitive node extends cranially, epiblast cells exposed to high concentrations of nodal begin initial movement into the primitive streak and become endoderm, while epiblast cells exposed to intermediate concentrations of nodal become mesoderm, and cells that are not stimulated by nodal become ectoderm. This process results in transition from the single layer epiblast into three germ layers of progenitor cells for all other adult body systems. Simultaneous action of cilia on the primitive node surface pushes increased concentrations to the left side of the embryo, establishing the left-right concentration gradient preceding asymmetrical organogenesis in later development due to downstream signaling cascades. Absence of Nodal leads to failed gastrulation and nonviability.

== Signaling ==
Nodal can bind type I and type II serine/threonine kinase receptors, with Cripto-1 acting as its co-receptor. Signaling through SMAD 2/3 and subsequent translocation of SMAD 4 to the nucleus promotes the expression of genes involved in proliferation and differentiation. Nodal also further activates its own expression via a positive feedback loop. It is tightly regulated by inhibitors Lefty A, Lefty B, Cerberus, and Tomoregulin-1, which can interfere with Nodal receptor binding.

== Species specific Nodal ligands ==
Nodal is a widely distributed cytokine. The presence of Nodal is not limited to vertebrates, it is also known to be conserved in other deuterostomes (cephalochordates, tunicates and echinoderms) and protostomes such as snails, but neither the nematode C. elegans (another protosome) nor the fruit fly Drosophila (an arthropod) have a copy of nodal. Although mouse and human only have one nodal gene, the zebrafish contain three nodal paralogs: squint, cyclops and southpaw, and the frog five (xnr1,2,3,5 and 6). Even though the zebrafish Nodal homologs are very similar, they have specialized to perform different roles; for instance, Squint and Cyclops are important for mesoendoderm formation, whereas the Southpaw has a major role in asymmetric heart morphogenesis and visceral left-right asymmetry. Another example of protein speciation is the case of the frog where Xnr1 and Xnr2 regulate movements in gastrulation in contrast to Xnr5 and Xnr6 that are involved in mesoderm induction. In mouse, Nodal has been implicated in left-right asymmetry, neural pattering and mesoderm induction (see nodal signaling).

== Functions ==
Nodal signaling regulates mesoderm formation in a species-specific manner. Thus, in Xenopus, Xnr controls dorso-ventral mesoderm formation along the marginal zone. In zebrafish, Squint and Cyclops are responsible for animal-vegetal mesoderm formation. In chicken and mouse, Vg1 and Nodal respectively promote primitive streak formation in the epiblast. In chick development, Nodal is expressed in Koller's sickle. Studies have shown that a nodal knockout in mouse causes the absence of the primitive streak and failure in the formation of mesoderm, leading to developmental arrest just after gastrulation.

Compared to mesoderm specification, endoderm specification requires a higher expression of Nodal. Here, Nodal stimulates mixer homeoproteins, which can interact with SMADs in order to up-regulate endoderm specific genes and repress mesoderm specific genes.

Left-right asymmetry (LR asymmetry) of visceral organs in vertebrates is also established through nodal signaling. Whereas Nodal is initially symmetrically expressed in the embryo, after gastrulation, Nodal becomes asymmetrically restricted to the left side of the organism. It is highly conserved among deuterostomes. An ortholog of Nodal was found in snails and was shown to be involved in left-right asymmetry as well in 2008.

In order to enable anterior neural tissue development, Nodal signaling needs to be repressed after inducing mesendoderm and LR asymmetry.

Recent research on mouse and human embryonic stem cells (hESCs) indicates that Nodal seems to be involved in the maintenance of stem cell self-renewal and pluripotent potentials. Thus, overexpression of Nodal in hESCs lead to the repression of cell differentiation. On the contrary, inhibition of Nodal and Activin signaling enabled the differentiation of hESCs.
