= Shroom protein family =

ASD1

Identifiers
- Symbol: ASD1
- Pfam: PF08688
- InterPro: IPR014800
Available protein structures:
- PDB: IPR014800 PF08688 (ECOD; PDBsum)
- AlphaFold: IPR014800; PF08688

ASD2

Identifiers
- Symbol: ASD2
- Pfam: PF08687
- InterPro: IPR014799
Available protein structures:
- PDB: IPR014799 PF08687 (ECOD; PDBsum)
- AlphaFold: IPR014799; PF08687

In molecular biology, the Shroom protein family is a small group of related proteins that are defined by sequence similarity and in most cases by some link to the actin cytoskeleton. The Shroom (Shrm) protein family is found only in animals. Proteins of this family are predicted to be utilised in multiple morphogenic and developmental processes across animal phyla to regulate cells shape or intracellular architecture in an actin and myosin-dependent manner. In mice and humans, the Shrm family of proteins consists of:

- Shrm1 (formerly Apx), a less well-characterized protein in humans, originally found in Xenopus.
- Shrm2 (formerly Apxl), a protein involved in the morphogenesis, maintenance, and/or function of vascular endothelial cells.
- Shrm3 (formerly Shroom), a protein necessary for neural tube closure in vertebrate development as deficiency in Shrm results in spina bifida. Shrm3 is also conserved in some invertebrates, as orthologues can be found in sea urchins.
- Shrm4, a regulator of cyto-skeletal architecture that may play an important role in vertebrate development. It is implicated in X-linked intellectual disability in humans.

This protein family is based on the conservation of a specific arrangement of an N-terminal PDZ domain, a centrally positioned sequence motif termed ASD1 (Apx/Shrm Domain 1) and a C-terminal motif termed ASD2. Shrm2 and Shrm3 contain all three domains, while Shrm4 contains the PDZ and ASD2 domains, but lacks a discernible ASD1 element. To date, the ASD1 and ASD2 elements have only been found in Shrm-related proteins and do not appear in combination with other conserved domains. ASD1 is required for targeting actin, while ASD2 is capable of eliciting an actomyosin based constriction event. ASD2 is the most highly conserved sequence element shared by Shrm1, Shrm2, Shrm3, and Shrm4. It possesses a well conserved series of leucine residues that exhibit spacing consistent with that of a leucine zipper motif.

Shroom2 is both necessary and sufficient to govern the localization of pigment granules at the apical surface of epithelial cells. Shroom2 is a central regulator of RPE pigmentation. Despite their diverse biological roles, Shroom family proteins share a common activity. Since the locus encoding human SHROOM2 lies within the critical region for two distinct forms of ocular albinism, it is possible that SHROOM2 mutations may contribute to human visual system disorders.
