= Involution (medicine) =

Shrinking of an organ to a former size

Involution is the shrinking or return of an organ to a former size. At a cellular level, involution is characterized by the process of proteolysis of the basement membrane (basal lamina), leading to epithelial regression and apoptosis, with accompanying stromal fibrosis. The consequent reduction in cell number and reorganization of stromal tissue leads to the reduction in the size of the organ.

== Examples ==
=== Thymus ===
The thymus continues to grow between birth and sexual maturity and then begins to atrophy, a process directed by the high levels of circulating sex hormones. Proportional to thymic size, thymic activity (T cell output) is most active before maturity. Upon atrophy, the size and activity are dramatically reduced, and the organ is primarily replaced with fat. The atrophy is due to the increased circulating level of sex hormones, and chemical or physical castration of an adult results in the thymus increasing in size and activity.

=== Uterus ===
Involution is the process by which the uterus is transformed from pregnant to non-pregnant state. This period is characterized by the restoration of ovarian function in order to prepare the body for a new pregnancy. It is a physiological process occurring after parturition; the hypertrophy of the uterus has to be undone since it does not need to house the fetus anymore. This process is primarily due to the hormone oxytocin. The completion of this period is defined as when the diameter of the uterus returns to the size it is normally during a woman's menstrual cycle.

=== Mammary gland ===
During pregnancy until after birth, mammary glands grow steadily to a size required for optimal milk production. At the end of nursing, the number of cells in the mammary gland becomes reduced until approximately the same number is reached as before the start of pregnancy.

== See also ==
- Subinvolution
