= Cellular communication network factor 6 =

Protein-coding gene in the species Homo sapiens

CCN6

Identifiers
- Aliases: CCN6, LIBC, PPAC, PPD, WISP-3, WNT1 inducible signaling pathway protein 3, WISP3, cellular communication network factor 6, PPRD
- External IDs: OMIM: 603400; MGI: 2685581; HomoloGene: 77038; GeneCards: CCN6; OMA:CCN6 - orthologs

Gene location (Human)
Chr.	Chromosome 6 (human)
Band	6q21	Start	112,054,075 bp
Band	6q21	End	112,069,686 bp

Gene location (Mouse)
Chr.	Chromosome 10 (mouse)
Band	10|10 B1	Start	39,150,970 bp
Band	10|10 B1	End	39,163,794 bp
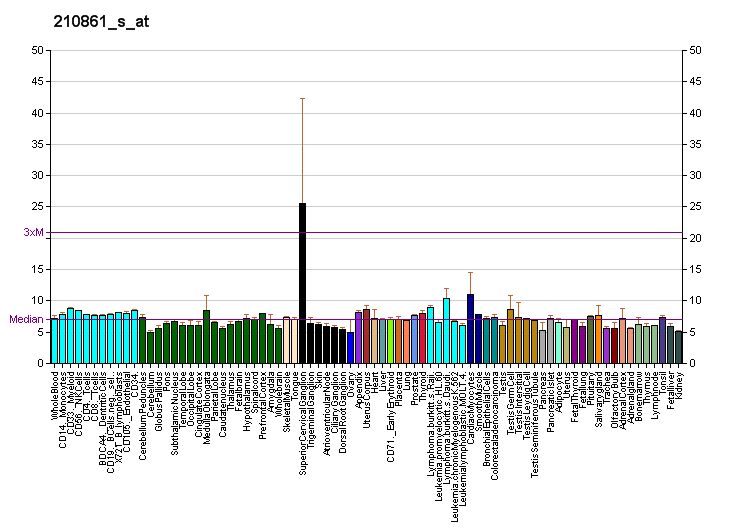
RNA expression pattern
Bgee	Human / Mouse (ortholog); Top expressed in: tibia; testicle; cartilage tissue; sperm; corpus epididymis; cerebellar hemisphere; right hemisphere of cerebellum; right uterine tube; right testis; skin of leg / Top expressed in: secondary oocyte; primary oocyte; zygote; neural layer of retina; thymus; embryo; embryo; bone marrow; granulocyte; lens; More reference expression data
BioGPS	More reference expression data
Gene ontology
Molecular function	insulin-like growth factor binding; growth factor activity; integrin binding; heparin binding
Cellular component	extracellular region; extracellular space; endoplasmic reticulum; extracellular matrix; mitochondrion
Biological process	cell-cell signaling; regulation of cell growth; signal transduction; cell adhesion; negative regulation of cell death; regulation of signaling receptor activity; regulation of mitochondrial membrane potential; regulation of reactive oxygen species biosynthetic process
Sources:Amigo / QuickGO
Orthologs
Species	Human	Mouse
Entrez	8838	327743
Ensembl	ENSG00000112761	ENSMUSG00000062074
UniProt	O95389	D3Z5L9
RefSeq (mRNA)	NM_003880; NM_130396; NM_198239	NM_001127376
RefSeq (protein)	NP_003871; NP_937882	NP_001120848
Location (UCSC)	Chr 6: 112.05 – 112.07 Mb	Chr 10: 39.15 – 39.16 Mb
PubMed search
- Wikidata
View/Edit Human	View/Edit Mouse

Cellular communication network factor 6, also known as WNT1-inducible-signaling pathway protein 3 (WISP3) is a matricellular protein that in humans is encoded by the CCN6 gene.

== Structure ==
It is a member of the CCN family (CCN intercellular signaling protein) of secreted, extracellular matrix (ECM)-associated signaling matricellular proteins. The CCN acronym is derived from the first three members of the family identified, namely CYR61 (cysteine-rich angiogenic inducer 61, or CCN1), CTGF (connective tissue growth factor, or CCN2), and NOV (nephroblastoma overexpressed, or CCN3). These proteins, together with WISP1 (CCN4), and WISP2 (CCN5) comprise the six-member CCN family in vertebrates. CCN proteins characteristically contain an N-terminal secretory signal peptide followed by four structurally distinct domains with homologies to insulin-like growth factor binding protein (IGFBP), von Willebrand type C repeats (vWC), thrombospondin type 1 repeat (TSR), and a cysteine knot motif within the C-terminal (CT) domain.

== Function ==
The CCN family of proteins regulates diverse cellular functions, including cell adhesion, migration, proliferation, survival, and differentiation.

== Clinical significance ==
Mutations in the human WISP3 gene are associated with progressive pseudorheumatoid dysplasia, a juvenile onset autosomal recessive skeletal disorder, indicating that the gene is essential for normal postnatal skeletal growth and cartilage homeostasis. However, mice with WISP3 knockout or overexpression are normal and suffer no apparent developmental defect. Loss of WISP3 expression is associated with aggressive inflammatory breast cancer and breast cancer with axillary lymph node metastasis, suggesting that WISP3/CCN6 may function as a suppressor of breast cancer growth and metastasis.
