= CCN family member 5 =

Protein-coding gene in the species Homo sapiens

CCN5

Identifiers
- Aliases: CCN5, CT58, CTGF-L, WNT1 inducible signaling pathway protein 2, WISP2, cellular communication network factor 5
- External IDs: OMIM: 603399; MGI: 1328326; HomoloGene: 2882; GeneCards: CCN5; OMA:CCN5 - orthologs

Gene location (Human)
Chr.	Chromosome 20 (human)
Band	20q13.12	Start	44,714,844 bp
Band	20q13.12	End	44,728,509 bp

Gene location (Mouse)
Chr.	Chromosome 2 (mouse)
Band	2|2 H3	Start	163,662,781 bp
Band	2|2 H3	End	163,675,066 bp
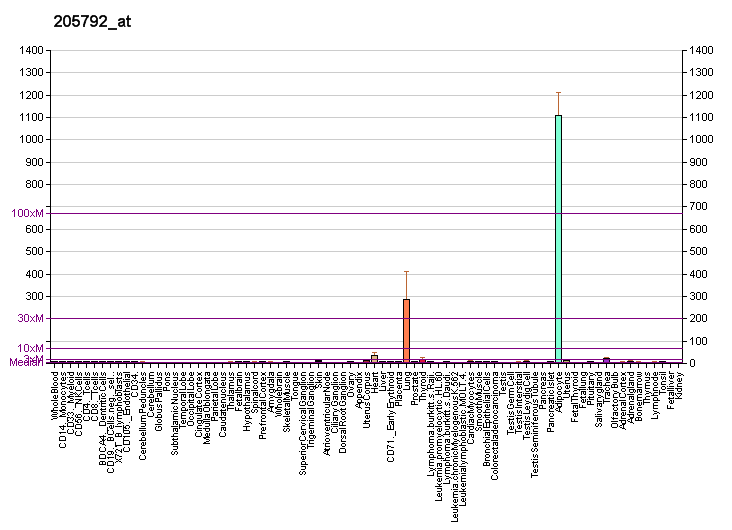
RNA expression pattern
Bgee	Human / Mouse (ortholog); Top expressed in: popliteal artery; tibial arteries; right coronary artery; left coronary artery; canal of the cervix; thoracic aorta; ascending aorta; right lung; Descending thoracic aorta; synovial joint / Top expressed in: stroma of bone marrow; calvaria; embryo; ascending aorta; ankle; tunica media of zone of aorta; aortic valve; tibiofemoral joint; endothelial cell of lymphatic vessel; lip; More reference expression data
BioGPS	More reference expression data
Gene ontology
Molecular function	insulin-like growth factor binding; integrin binding; heparin binding
Cellular component	extracellular region; extracellular space; extracellular matrix; nucleus
Biological process	cell-cell signaling; regulation of cell growth; signal transduction; cell adhesion; negative regulation of cell death
Sources:Amigo / QuickGO
Orthologs
Species	Human	Mouse
Entrez	8839	22403
Ensembl	ENSG00000064205	ENSMUSG00000027656
UniProt	O76076	Q9Z0G4
RefSeq (mRNA)	NM_003881; NM_001323369; NM_001323370	NM_016873
RefSeq (protein)	NP_001310298; NP_001310299; NP_003872	NP_058569
Location (UCSC)	Chr 20: 44.71 – 44.73 Mb	Chr 2: 163.66 – 163.68 Mb
PubMed search
- Wikidata
View/Edit Human	View/Edit Mouse

CCN family member 5, also known as WNT1-inducible-signaling pathway protein 2 (WISP-2), is a matricellular protein that in humans is encoded by the CCN5 gene.

== Function ==
The CCN family of proteins regulates diverse cellular functions, including cell adhesion, migration, proliferation, differentiation.

== Structure ==
WISP-2 is a member of the CCN family (CCN intercellular signaling protein) of secreted, extracellular matrix (ECM)-associated signaling matricellular proteins. The CCN acronym is derived from the first three members of the family identified, namely CYR61 (CCN1), CTGF (connective tissue growth factor, or CCN2), and NOV. These proteins, together with WISP1/CCN4, WISP2 (CCN5, this gene), and WISP3 (CCN6) comprise the six-member CCN family in vertebrates. CCN proteins characteristically contain an N-terminal secretory signal peptide followed by four structurally distinct domains with homologies to insulin-like growth factor binding protein (IGFBP), von Willebrand type C repeats (vWC), thrombospondin type 1 repeat (TSR), and a cysteine knot motif within the C-terminal (CT) domain. However, WISP-2 is unique among this family of proteins by lacking precisely the CT domain.

== Clinical significance ==
WISP-2 (CCN5) inhibits the proliferation of vascular smooth muscle cells, human uterine myometrial cells, and leiomyoma cells. Ectopic expression of WISP-2 also inhibits the motility and invasiveness of breast carcinoma cells. WISP-2 also inhibits cardiac hypertrophy and fibrosis, an effect that appears linked to the absence of the CT domain.
