= CCN family member 3 =

Protein-coding gene in the species Homo sapiens

CCN3

Identifiers
- Aliases: CCN3, IBP-9, IGFBP-9, IGFBP9, NOVh, nephroblastoma overexpressed, cellular communication network factor 3, NOV
- External IDs: OMIM: 164958; MGI: 109185; HomoloGene: 1884; GeneCards: CCN3; OMA:CCN3 - orthologs

Gene location (Human)
Chr.	Chromosome 8 (human)
Band	8q24.12	Start	119,416,446 bp
Band	8q24.12	End	119,424,434 bp

Gene location (Mouse)
Chr.	Chromosome 15 (mouse)
Band	15 D1|15 21.49 cM	Start	54,609,098 bp
Band	15 D1|15 21.49 cM	End	54,617,435 bp
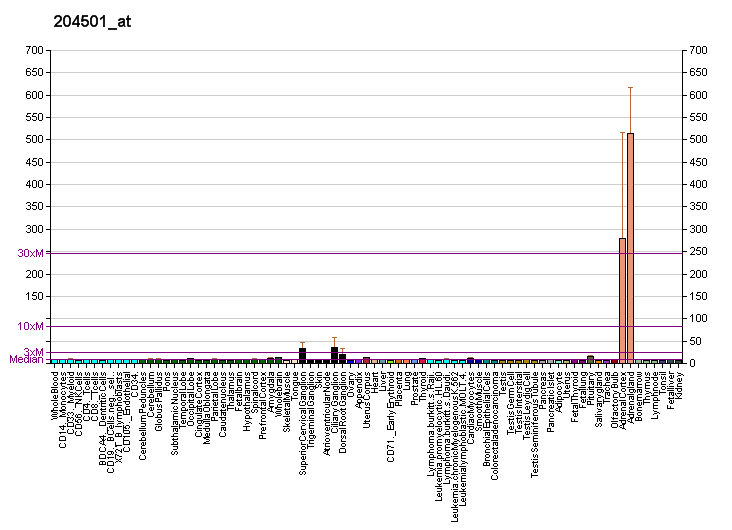

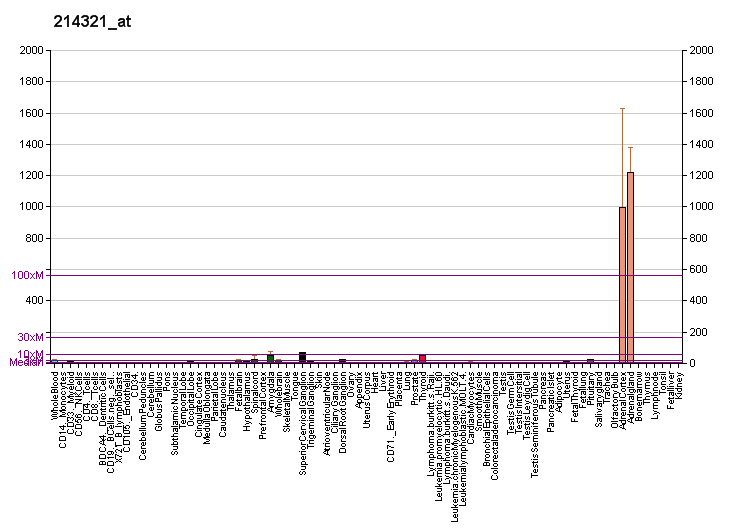
RNA expression pattern
Bgee	Human / Mouse (ortholog); Top expressed in: right coronary artery; adrenal cortex; left adrenal cortex; right adrenal gland; right adrenal cortex; ascending aorta; popliteal artery; tibial arteries; Descending thoracic aorta; saphenous vein / Top expressed in: tunica media of zone of aorta; subiculum; ascending aorta; aortic valve; optic nerve; Region I of hippocampus proper; pineal gland; anterior amygdaloid area; suprachiasmatic nucleus; ankle; More reference expression data
BioGPS	More reference expression data
Gene ontology
Molecular function	insulin-like growth factor binding; Notch binding; integrin binding; protein binding; growth factor activity; heparin binding
Cellular component	cytoplasm; intracellular membrane-bounded organelle; extracellular matrix; extracellular region; axon; soma; cell junction; dendrite; gap junction; collagen-containing extracellular matrix
Biological process	fibroblast migration; hematopoietic stem cell homeostasis; negative regulation of insulin secretion; chondrocyte differentiation; negative regulation of sensory perception of pain; smooth muscle cell migration; negative regulation of SMAD protein signal transduction; endothelial cell-cell adhesion; negative regulation of chondrocyte proliferation; bone regeneration; negative regulation of monocyte chemotaxis; cell adhesion mediated by integrin; negative regulation of cell growth; regulation of cell growth; angiogenesis; endothelial cell chemotaxis; negative regulation of myotube differentiation; cell chemotaxis; regulation of gene expression; smooth muscle cell proliferation; negative regulation of inflammatory response; type B pancreatic cell proliferation; positive regulation of Notch signaling pathway; cell-cell signaling; negative regulation of cell death; regulation of signaling receptor activity; negative regulation of NIK/NF-kappaB signaling; cell adhesion; signal transduction
Sources:Amigo / QuickGO
Orthologs
Species	Human	Mouse
Entrez	4856	18133
Ensembl	ENSG00000136999	ENSMUSG00000037362
UniProt	P48745	Q64299
RefSeq (mRNA)	NM_002514	NM_010930
RefSeq (protein)	NP_002505	NP_035060
Location (UCSC)	Chr 8: 119.42 – 119.42 Mb	Chr 15: 54.61 – 54.62 Mb
PubMed search
- Wikidata
View/Edit Human	View/Edit Mouse

CCN family member 3, also known as NOV (nephroblastoma overexpressed), is a matricellular protein that in humans is encoded by the CCN3 gene.

== CCN family ==
NOV is a member of the CCN family of secreted, extracellular matrix (ECM)-associated signaling proteins (see also CCN intercellular signaling protein). The CCN acronym is derived from the first three members of the family being identified, namely CYR61 (cysteine-rich angiogenic inducer 61, or CCN1), CTGF (connective tissue growth factor, or CCN2), and NOV. These proteins, together with WISP1 (CCN4), WISP2 (CCN5), and WISP3 (CCN6) comprise the six-member CCN family in vertebrates and have been renamed CCN1-6 in the order of their discovery by international consensus.

== Structure ==
The human NOV protein contains 357 amino acids with an N-terminal secretory signal peptide followed by four structurally distinct domains with homologies to insulin-like growth factor binding protein (IGFBP), von Willebrand type C repeats (vWC), thrombospondin type 1 repeat (TSR), and a cysteine knot motif within the C-terminal (CT) domain.

== Function ==
NOV regulates multiple cellular activities including cell adhesion, migration, proliferation, differentiation, and survival. It functions by direct binding to integrin receptors, as well as other receptors such as NOTCH1 and fibulin 1c (FBLN1). NOV is expressed during wound healing and induces angiogenesis in vivo. It is essential for self-renewal of CD34+ hematopoietic stem cells from umbilical cord blood. Nov is regulated by the hematopoietic transcription factor MZF-1.

NOV can bind BMP2 and inhibit its functions in promoting osteogenic differentiation, and stimulate osteoclastogenesis through a process that may involve calcium flux. Overexpression of Nov in transgenic mice in osteoblasts antagonizes both BMP and Wnt-signaling and result in osteopenia.

In February 2017, it was reported that the NOV protein was involved in regulatory T cell-mediated oligodendrocyte differentiation in the regeneration of myelin following damage to the myelin sheath. This finding revealed a new function for regulatory T cells that is distinct from their role in immunomodulation. NOV (CCN3) has recently been implicated in mood disorders, notably in the postpartum period; these effects may be mediated by its effects on myelination

== Role in embryo development ==
In contrast to the lethality of Cyr61 (CCN1) and Ctgf (CCN2) genetic knockout in mice, Nov-null mice are viable and largely normal, exhibiting only modest and transient sexually dimorphic skeletal abnormalities. However, Nov-null mice show enhanced blood vessel neointimal thickening when challenged with vascular injury, indicating that NOV inhibits neoinitimal hyperplasia.

== Role in cancer ==
Although NOV inhibits the proliferation of cancer cells, it appears to promote metastasis. Nov overexpression results in reduced tumor size in glioma cells xenografts, but enhances metastatic potential in xenotransplanted melanoma cells. NOV expression is associated with a higher risk of metastasis and worse prognosis in patients with cancers such as Ewing's sarcoma, melanoma, and breast cancer. In chronic myeloid leukemia (CML), NOV is downregulated as a consequence of the kinase activity of BCR-ABL, a chimeric protein generated through the chromosomal translocation between chromosome 9 and 22. Forced expression of NOV inhibits proliferation and restores growth control in CML cells, suggesting that NOV may be an alternate target for novel therapeutics against CML.
