= VWFC =

VWFC may refer to:

- Von Willebrand factor type C domain, a protein domain and family
- Very Wide Field Camera, space camera developed by NASA for Spacelab 1 and Spacelab 3
- Vancouver Whitecaps FC, a Canadian professional soccer team
