= CCN family member 1 =

Protein found in humans

CCN1
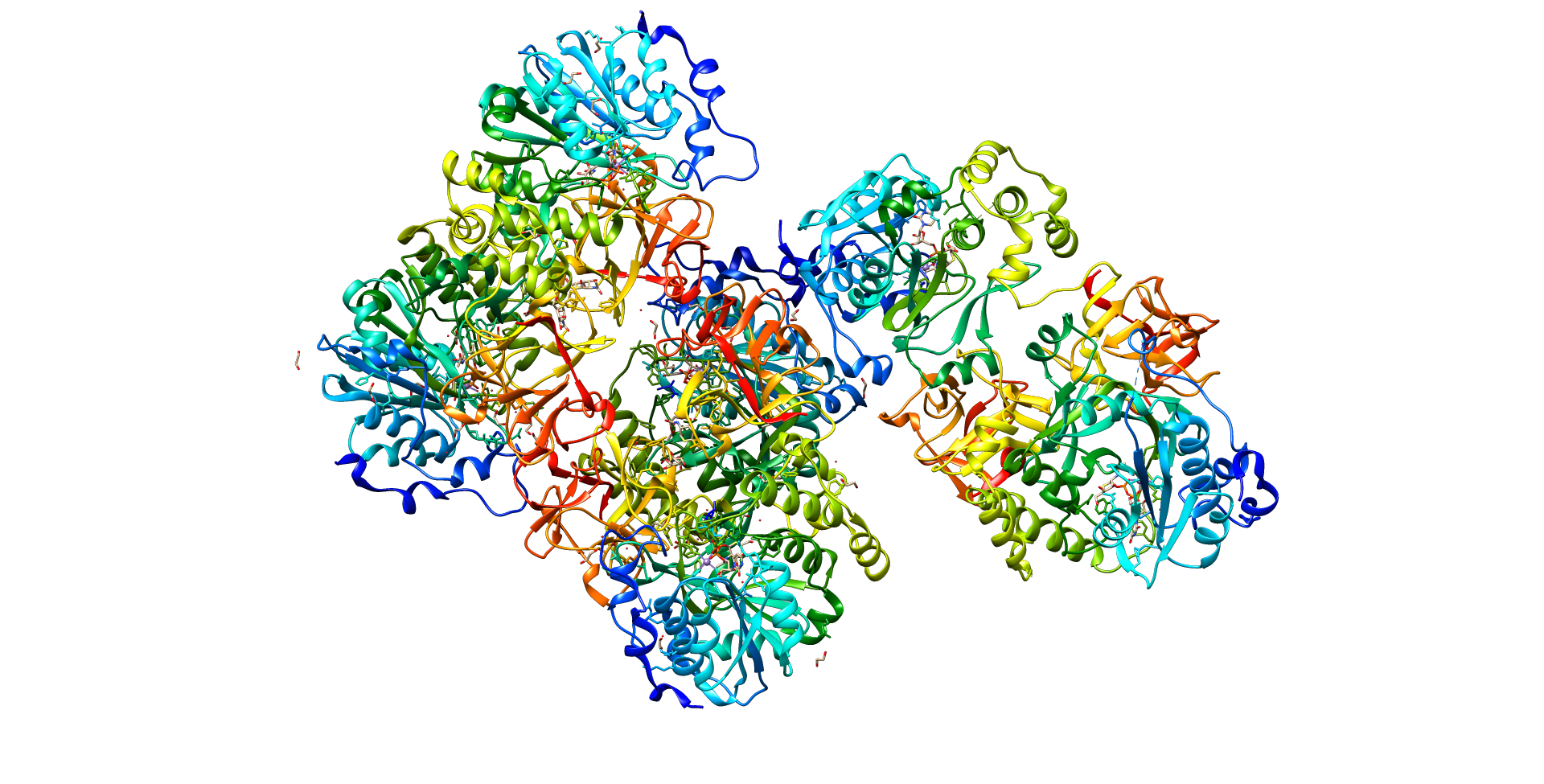

Identifiers
- Aliases: CCN1, GIG1, IGFBP10, cysteine rich angiogenic inducer 61, cellular communication network factor 1, CYR61
- External IDs: OMIM: 602369; MGI: 88613; GeneCards: CCN1
Available structures
| PDB | Ortholog search: PDBe RCSB |
| PDB | List of PDB id codes 4D0Z, 4D11 |

Gene location (Human)
| Chr. | Chromosome 1 (human) |
| Band | 1p22.3 | Start | 85,580,761 bp |
| Band | 1p22.3 | End | 85,584,589 bp |

Gene location (Mouse)
| Chr. | Chromosome 3 (mouse) |
| Band | 3 H2|3 70.18 cM | Start | 145,352,731 bp |
| Band | 3 H2|3 70.18 cM | End | 145,355,736 bp |
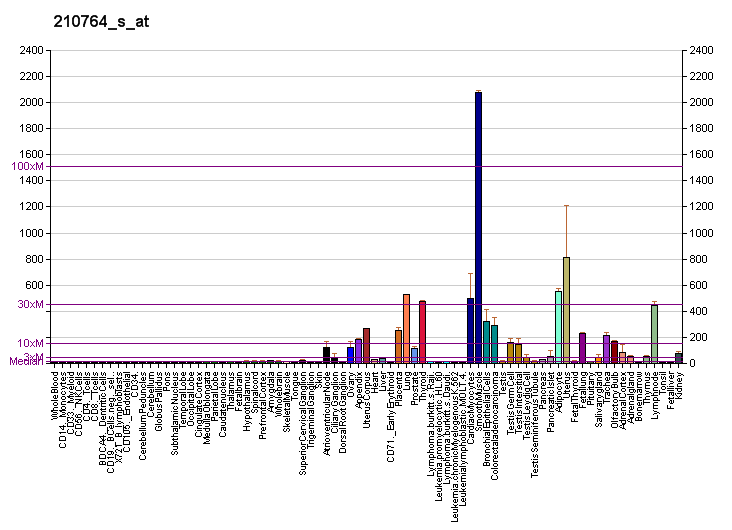

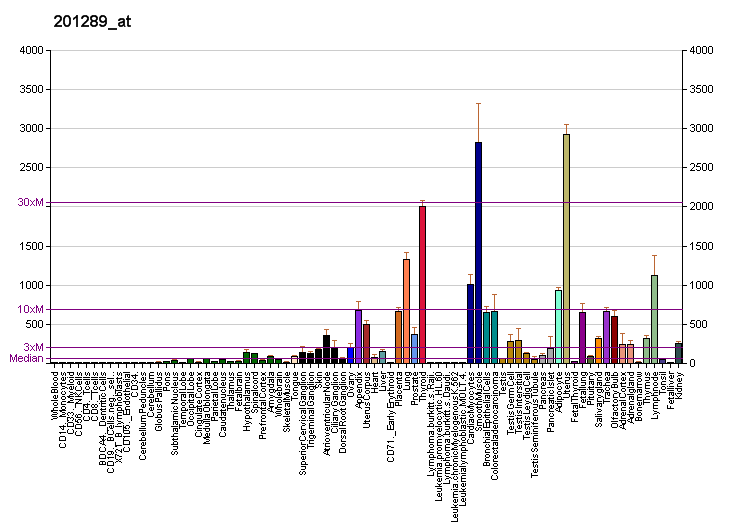
RNA expression pattern
| Bgee | Human / Mouse (ortholog); Top expressed in: left uterine tube; smooth muscle tissue; gallbladder; vena cava; saphenous vein; gastric mucosa; lower lobe of lung; right coronary artery; left coronary artery; nipple / Top expressed in: endothelial cell of lymphatic vessel; stroma of bone marrow; calvaria; dermis; tunica media of zone of aorta; muscle of thigh; decidua; umbilical cord; body of femur; right lung; More reference expression data |
| BioGPS | More reference expression data |
Gene ontology
| Molecular function | insulin-like growth factor binding; growth factor binding; extracellular matrix binding; integrin binding; heparin binding; extracellular matrix structural constituent |
| Cellular component | extracellular matrix; extracellular region; extracellular space; endoplasmic reticulum lumen; collagen-containing extracellular matrix |
| Biological process | positive regulation of osteoblast proliferation; apoptotic process involved in heart morphogenesis; positive regulation of ceramide biosynthetic process; positive regulation of protein phosphorylation; ventricular septum development; positive regulation of cell migration; anatomical structure morphogenesis; extracellular matrix organization; negative regulation of apoptotic process; labyrinthine layer blood vessel development; reactive oxygen species metabolic process; chorio-allantoic fusion; chondroblast differentiation; chemotaxis; positive regulation of phospholipase activity; atrial septum morphogenesis; positive regulation of cysteine-type endopeptidase activity involved in apoptotic process; intussusceptive angiogenesis; positive regulation of osteoblast differentiation; atrioventricular valve morphogenesis; positive regulation of cartilage development; regulation of cell growth; osteoblast differentiation; positive regulation of cell differentiation; regulation of ERK1 and ERK2 cascade; positive regulation of BMP signaling pathway; positive regulation of apoptotic process; cell population proliferation; wound healing, spreading of cells; positive regulation of transcription by RNA polymerase II; positive regulation of protein kinase activity; positive regulation of cell-substrate adhesion; post-translational protein modification; cell adhesion; cell-cell signaling; negative regulation of cell death; cell-cell adhesion; positive regulation of bone mineralization |
Sources:Amigo / QuickGO
Orthologs
| Databases | NCBI: entry; OMA: entry |
| Species | Human | Mouse |
| Entrez | 3491 | 16007 |
| Ensembl | ENSG00000142871 | ENSMUSG00000028195 |
| UniProt | O00622 | P18406 |
| RefSeq (mRNA) | NM_001554 | NM_010516 |
| RefSeq (protein) | NP_001545 | NP_034646 |
| Location (UCSC) | Chr 1: 85.58 – 85.58 Mb | Chr 3: 145.35 – 145.36 Mb |
| PubMed search |
- Wikidata
| View/Edit Human | View/Edit Mouse |

CCN family member 1 (CCN1), or Cysteine-rich angiogenic inducer 61 (CYR61), is a matricellular protein that in humans is encoded by the CCN1 gene.

CCN1 is a secreted, extracellular matrix (ECM)–associated signaling protein of the CCN family (CCN intercellular signaling protein). CCN1 is capable of regulating a broad range of cellular activities, including cell adhesion, migration, proliferation, differentiation, apoptosis, and senescence through interaction with cell surface integrin receptors and heparan sulfate proteoglycans. During embryonic development, CCN1 is critical for cardiac septal morphogenesis, blood vessel formation in placenta, and vascular integrity. In adulthood CCN1 plays important roles in inflammation and tissue repair, and is associated with diseases related to chronic inflammation, including rheumatoid arthritis, atherosclerosis, diabetes-related nephropathy and retinopathy, and many different forms of cancers.

== CCN protein family ==
CCN1 was first identified as a protein encoded by a serum-inducible gene in mouse fibroblasts. Other highly conserved homologs were later identified to comprise the CCN protein family (CCN intercellular signaling protein). The CCN acronym is derived from the first three members of the family identified, namely CYR61 (CCN1), CTGF (connective tissue growth factor, or CCN2), and NOV (nephroblastoma overexpressed, or CCN3). These proteins, together with WISP1 (CCN4), WISP2 (CCN5), and WISP3 (CCN6) comprise the six members of the family in vertebrates and have been renamed CCN1-6 in order of their discovery by international consensus. CCN proteins function as matricellular proteins, which are extracellular matrix proteins that play regulatory roles, particularly in the context of wound repair.

== Gene structure and regulation ==
CCN1 is located at human chromosome 1p22.3, whereas the mouse CCN1 gene is located at chromosome 3, 72.9cM. The mouse CCN1 coding region spans ~3.2 Kb, containing 5 exons interspaced with 4 introns. The first exon encodes 5’-UTR sequence and the first several amino acids in the secretory signal peptide. The remaining four exons each encode a distinct CCN1 domain. The 5th exon also contains the 3’-UTR sequences, which has 5 copies of AU-rich elements that confers a short mRNA half life, and a mir-155 target site. The CCN1 promoter is a TATA box containing promoter, with binding sites for many transcription factors including AP1, ATF, E2F, HNF3b, NF1, NFκB, SP1, and SRF, and 2 poly(CA) stretches that may form Z-DNA structure. Transcriptional activation of CCN1 is exquisitely sensitive to a wide range of environmental perturbations, including stimulation by platelet-derived growth factor and basic fibroblast growth factor, transforming growth factor β1 (TGF-β1), growth hormone, the phorbol ester 12-O-tetradecanoylphorbol-13-acetate (TPA), cAMP, vitamin D3, estrogen and tamoxifen, angiotensin II, hypoxia, UV light, and mechanical stretch.

== Protein structure and function ==
=== Structural domains ===
Full-length CCN1 protein contains 381 amino acids with an N-terminal secretory signal peptide followed by four structurally distinct domains. The four CCN1 domains are, from N- to C-termini, the insulin-like growth factor binding protein (IGFBP) domain, von Willebrand type C repeats (vWC) domain, thrombospondin type 1 repeat domain (TSR), and the C-terminal (CT) domain that contains a cysteine-knot motif. CCN1 has unusually high cysteine residue content (10% or 38 in total). The number and spacing of cysteine residues are completely conserved among CCN1, CTGF (CCN2), NOV (CCN3), and WISP-1 (CCN4), and are largely conserved with WISP-2 (CCN5), which lacks precisely the CT domain, and WISP3 (CCN6), which lacks 4 cysteines in the vWC domain. CCN1 is glycosylated, although the regulation and function of glycosylation are unknown.

CCN1 protein structure

=== Integrin binding ===
CCN1 binds directly to various integrin receptors in a cell type-dependent manner, including integrin αvβ3 in endothelial cells, α6β1 and heparan sulfate proteoglycans (HSPGs) in fibroblasts and smooth muscle cells αIIbβ3 in activated platelets, αMβ2 in monocytes and macrophages, and αDβ2 in macrophage foam cells. Where examined, syndecan-4 has been identified as the HSPG critical for CCN1 functions. The CCN1 binding sites for some of these integrins have been mapped (Figure 1). Due to the cell type specificity of integrin expression, CCN1 acts through distinct integrins to mediate specific functions in different types of cells. For example, CCN1 induces angiogenic functions in endothelial cells through αvβ3, and in fibroblasts promotes cellular senescence and enables TNFα to induce apoptosis through binding to α6β1-HSPGs. However, CCN1 supports cell adhesion through all of the integrins identified above.

=== Cell signaling and function ===
As a cell adhesive substrate, CCN1 induces the activation of focal adhesion kinase, paxillin, RAC, and sustained activation of MAPK/ERK1-2. In macrophages, CCN1 also activates the transcription factor NFκB and stimulates M1 polarization. CYR61 activates Akt signaling in thymic epithelial cells, promoting their proliferation and thus thymic size growth. CCN1 has potent angiogenic activity upon endothelial cells and induces neovascularization, first demonstrated in a corneal micropocket implant assay and subsequently confirmed in a rabbit ischemic hindlimb model. CCN1 also accelerates and promotes the chondrogenic differentiation of mouse limb bud mesenchymal cells, and stimulates osteoblast differentiation but inhibits osteoclastogenesis. CCN1 is a strong inducer of reactive oxygen species accumulation in fibroblastic cells, and this activity underlies many CCN1-induced apoptosis and senescence. CYR61 is able to support cell adhesion, stimulate cell migration, promote growth factor-induced cell proliferation and differentiation in some cell types, promote apoptosis in synergy with TNF family cytokines, and induce cellular senescence in fibroblasts.

== Embryonic development ==
During embryo development in mice, CCN1 is highly expressed in the cardiovascular, skeletal, and neuronal systems. CCN1 knockout mice are embryonic lethal due to defects in cardiac septal morphogenesis, deficient blood vessel formation in placenta, and compromised vascular integrity. In Xenopus laevis, CCN1 is required for normal gastrulation and modulation of Wnt signaling.

== Clinical relevance ==
CCN1 is highly expressed at sites of inflammation and wound repair, and is associated with diseases involving chronic inflammation and tissue injury.

=== Wound healing and fibrosis ===
In skin wound healing, CCN1 is highly expressed in the granulation tissue by myofibroblasts, which proliferate and rapidly synthesize ECM to maintain tissue integrity and to promote regeneration of parenchymal cells. However, excessive matrix deposition can lead to fibrosis, scarring, and loss of tissue function. In skin wounds, CCN1 accumulates in the granulation tissue as myofibroblasts proliferate, and eventually reaches a sufficiently high level to drive the myofibroblasts themselves into senescence, whereupon these cells cease to proliferate and express matrix-degrading enzymes. Thus, CCN1 limits synthesis and deposition of ECM by myofibroblasts, reducing the risk of fibrosis during wound healing. In addition to skin wound healing, CCN1 expression is elevated in remodeling cardiomyocytes after myocardial infarction, in vascular injury, and in the long bones during fracture repair. Blockade of CCN1 by antibodies inhibits bone fracture healing in mice. In the kidney, CCN1 is expressed in podocytes in normal adult and embryonic glomeruli, but expression is decreased in IgA nephropathy, diabetic nephropathy, and membranous nephropathy, particularly in diseased kidneys with severe mesangial expansion. CYR61 induction of cellular senescence in the kidney is a potential therapy to limit fibrosis.

=== Inflammation ===
CCN1 promotes the apoptotic functions of inflammatory cytokines such as TNFα, FasL, and TRAIL. It also reprograms macrophages towards M1 polarization through αMβ2-mediated activation of NF-κB. CCN1 is upregulated in patients with Crohn's disease and ulcerative colitis. CCN1 supports the patrolling behavior of murine resident Ly6C^{low} monocytes along the endothelial in the steady state and is required for their accumulation under viral-mimicking vascular inflammation.

=== Arthritis ===
CCN1 is highly expressed in collagen-induced arthritis in rodents, and inhibition of CCN1 expression correlates with suppression of inflammatory arthritis. CCN1 is also found in articular cartilage from patients with osteoarthritis and appears to suppress ADAMTS4 (aggrecanase) activity, possibly leading to cartilage cell (chondrocyte) cloning.

=== Vascular diseases ===
CCN1 is overexpressed in vascular smooth muscle cells of atherosclerotic lesions and in the neointima of restenosis after balloon angioplasty, both in rodent models and in humans. Suppression of CCN1 expression results in reduced neointimal hyperplasia after balloon angioplasty, an effect that is reversed by delivery of CCN1 via gene transfer In a mouse model of oxygen-induced retinopathy, expression of CCN1 in the vitreous humor produced significant beneficial effects in repairing damaged vasculature.

=== Cancer ===
Angiogenesis is essential for the supply of oxygen and nutrients to nourish the growing tumor. CCN1 is a powerful angiogenic inducer in vivo, and it can also promote cancer cell proliferation, invasion, survival, epithelial–mesenchymal transition, and metastasis. Accordingly, forced overexpression of CCN1 enhanced tumor growth in xenografts of breast cancer cells, prostate cancer cells, ovarian carcinoma cells, and squamous carcinoma cells. Clinically, CCN1 expression correlates with the tumor stage, tumor size, lymph node positivity, and poor prognosis in several cancers, including breast cancer, prostate cancer, glioma, gastric adenocarcinoma, and squamous cell carcinoma.

However, CCN1 can also induce apoptosis and cellular senescence, two well-established mechanisms of tumor suppression Thus, whereas CCN1 can promote the proliferation of prostate cancer cells, it can also exacerbate apoptosis of these cells in the presence of the immune surveillance molecule TRAIL. CCN1 has an inhibitory effect on some cancers, and suppresses tumor growth of non-small-cell lung cancer (NSCLC) cells, endometrial adenocarcinoma cells, and in melanoma cells.
