= WNT5B =

Protein-coding gene in the species Homo sapiens

Identifiers
- Aliases: WNT5B, Wnt family member 5B
- External IDs: OMIM: 606361; MGI: 98959; GeneCards: WNT5B

Gene location (Human)
Chr.	Chromosome 12 (human)
Band	12p13.33	Start	1,529,891 bp
Band	12p13.33	End	1,647,212 bp

Gene location (Mouse)
Chr.	Chromosome 6 (mouse)
Band	6 F1|6 56.86 cM	Start	119,409,492 bp
Band	6 F1|6 56.86 cM	End	119,521,308 bp
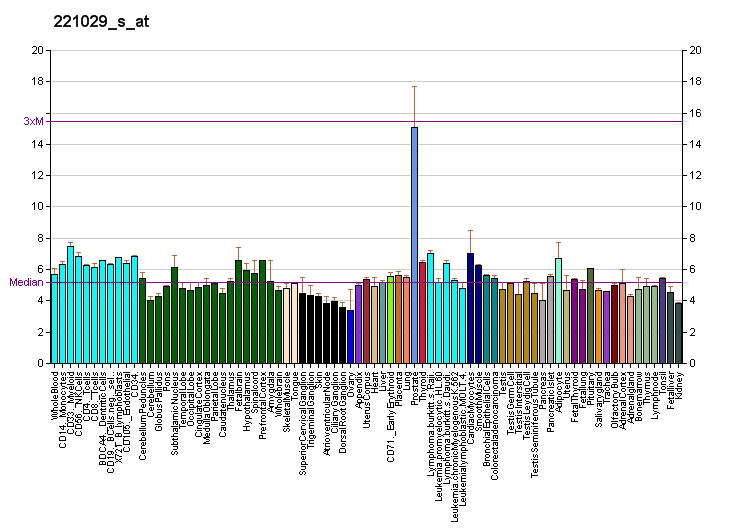
RNA expression pattern
Bgee	Human / Mouse (ortholog); Top expressed in: stromal cell of endometrium; periodontal fiber; prostate; muscle layer of sigmoid colon; minor salivary glands; palpebral conjunctiva; tibia; ventricular zone; olfactory zone of nasal mucosa; testicle / Top expressed in: epithelium of lens; renal corpuscle; lamina propria of urethra; primitive streak; adventitia of seminal vesicle; aortic valve; adrenal medulla; internal carotid artery; vas deferens; conjunctival fornix; More reference expression data
BioGPS	More reference expression data
Gene ontology
Molecular function	frizzled binding; signaling receptor binding
Cellular component	endocytic vesicle membrane; endoplasmic reticulum lumen; plasma membrane; extracellular region; cell surface; Golgi lumen; extracellular exosome; extracellular space; extracellular matrix; collagen-containing extracellular matrix
Biological process	cellular response to retinoic acid; cell fate commitment; chondrocyte differentiation; positive regulation of cell migration; wound healing; multicellular organism development; neuron differentiation; positive regulation of fat cell differentiation; fat cell differentiation; negative regulation of canonical Wnt signaling pathway; lens fiber cell development; Wnt signaling pathway
Sources:Amigo / QuickGO
Orthologs
Databases	NCBI: entry; OMA: entry
Species	Human	Mouse
Entrez	81029	22419
Ensembl	ENSG00000111186	ENSMUSG00000030170
UniProt	Q9H1J7	P22726
RefSeq (mRNA)	NM_030775; NM_032642	NM_001271757; NM_001271758; NM_009525
RefSeq (protein)	NP_110402; NP_116031	NP_001258686; NP_001258687; NP_033551
Location (UCSC)	Chr 12: 1.53 – 1.65 Mb	Chr 6: 119.41 – 119.52 Mb
PubMed search
- Wikidata
View/Edit Human	View/Edit Mouse

Protein Wnt-5b is a protein that in humans is encoded by the WNT5B gene.

The WNT gene family consists of structurally-related genes that encode secreted signaling proteins. These proteins have been implicated in oncogenesis and in several developmental processes, including regulation of cell fate and patterning during embryogenesis. This gene is a member of the WNT gene family. It encodes a protein showing 94% and 80% amino acid identity to the mouse Wnt5b protein and the human WNT5A protein, respectively. Alternative splicing of this gene generates two transcript variants.
