= Progressive pseudorheumatoid dysplasia =

Bone and cartilage disorder

Progressive pseudorheumatoid disyplasia (PPD, PPRD), also known as progressive pseudorheumatoid arthropathy of childhood (PPAD), is a disorder of bone and cartilage that affects many joints. The disorder leads to stiff joints, short stature and widening of the ends of the finger and toe bones as well as other tubular bones.

== Cause ==
PPD is caused by changes in the Wnt1-inducible signalling protein 3 (WISP3) gene, also known as the CCN6 gene, which encodes a signalling factor involved in cartilage homeostasis. Genomic changes to the gene result in a non-functional protein, which disrupts cartilage aintenance and bone growth. The disorder is inherited in an autosomal recessive pattern.

== Symptoms ==
Symptoms are present typically between ages three and six years.

- Abnormal walking pattern
- Weakness/fatigue
- Stiffness in the joints of the fingers and knees

Symptoms that may develop over time include:

- permanently bent fingers
- enlarged finger and knee joints
- hip pain

== Diagnosis ==
PPD is diagnosed by molecular genetic testing or through radiography with characteristic skeletal features.

Since symptoms of PPD are similar to juvenile rhematoid arthritis, people with PPD may be initially misdiagnosed.

== Treatment ==
Treatment for PPD is supportive. Anti-inflammatory drugs may be used for pain due to secondary osteoarthritis. More severe joint pain may be treated with surgery. Physical therapy, occupational therapy, may help with joint stiffness.

== Prognosis ==
PPD has no severe effect on life span.

== Epidemiology ==
PPD is an extremely rare disease. In the United States the disease is estimated to affect less than 5,000 people and approximately 1 per million people in the United Kingdom however it is believed to be more common in Turkey and the Middle East.
