= Type V collagen =

Type V collagen is a form of fibrillar collagen associated with classical Ehlers–Danlos syndrome. It is found within the dermal/epidermal junction, placental tissues, as well as in association with tissues containing type I collagen.

Type V collagen is a part of the family of collagen proteins consisting of Collagen I – Collagen XXVIII. Collagen proteins are often associated with the strengthening and support of many tissues including skin, bones, muscles, and ligaments. There are some studies that suggest that Type V collagen is responsible for the formation of other collagen fibrils in different tissues within the body. According to studies, Collagen V regulates the heterotypic fiber diameter. Type V Collagen is considered a regulatory fibril forming collagen. Collagen V is associated with the COL5A1 gene which is the gene which provides instructions to produce Collagen V. Type V Collagen, like other collagens, is made up of procollagen molecules.

Collagen V molecular isoforms are α1(V)α2(V)α3(V), α1(V)_{3}, and α1(V)_{2}α2(V). These procollagen molecules are made up of three different α -polypeptide chains. These α-polypeptide chains are α1(V), α2(V), and α3(V). Different combinations of these chains form the Type V collagen Isoforms. Procollagen molecules then form mature collagen with the help of enzymes. After the chains are formed, they arrange into thin fibrils. These collagen fibrils then assort with type I collagen fibrils.

Type V collagen is a part of the Extracellular Matrix (ECM). Collagen V is gene expression modulated by TGF-β. Type V collagen has shown that it is resistant to digestion by interstitial collagenases. Denatured collagen V on the other hand, can be degraded by gelatinases as well as metalloproteinases.

== Alternative names ==
Type V collagen has a few alternative names alpha 1 These include: type V collagen preproprotein, CO5A1_HUMAN, and collagen type V alpha. Type V collagen can also be abbreviated to COLV or collagen V.

== Diseases associated with type V collagen ==
Some studies show that a mutation in the gene that codes for Type V collagen is linked as the cause of a form of Ehlers–Danlos syndrome. Ehlers–Danlos Syndrome Classical Type is the result of mutations of the COL5A1 or COL5A2 gene which both code for Type V Collagen. This form of the Ehlers–Danlos Syndrome (classical type) is associated with hypermobility, scarring and elasticity of the skin and other tissues. Researchers discovered the cause of this form of Ehlers–Danlos is due to the mutation that produces less chains from the three chains that make up Type V Collagen. Over 100 mutations to the gene COL5A1 have been identified. These mutations result in the underproduction of pro-α1(V) chains. With these mutations, Type V Collagen fibrils are not fully developed and disorganized. This results in the different symptoms of Ehlers–Danlos Syndrome.

== Health ==
Type V Collagen studies show that Collagen V plays some other roles in different parts of the body. These roles can be both beneficial and harmful.

Beneficial roles that Type V collagen plays in the body are:

- Type V Collagens isoform which contains the α3(V) chain is involved in mediating pancreatic islet cell functions.
- Type V Collagens will arrange with Type I Collagen and form heterotypic fibrils in the skin dermis and cornea. Together, Collagen V and Collagen I acts as a dominant regulator of collagen fibrillogenesis.
- Type V Collagens interacts with matrix collagens and structural proteins. This interaction improves structural integrity to tissue scaffolds.

Harmful roles that Type V collagen can play in the body.

- Having a Type V Collagen deficiency has been associated with loss of corneal transparency and classic Ehlers-Danlos syndrome.
- Studies have shown that an overexpression of Type V Collagen can lead to harmful responses in the body. Collagen V overexpression has been found in cancer, granulation tissue, inflammation and atherosclerosis. It is also linked to fibrosis of the lungs, skin, kidneys, adipose tissue, and liver.
- Increases in Type V Collagen are associated with both early and advanced hepatic fibrosis.
- Studies show that increased synthesis of abnormal Type V Collagen is linked to the pathogenesis of systemic sclerosis.
- Collagen V can be an autoantigen, leading the body to attack itself. Autoimmunity against Collagen V can be initiated from arteriosclerotic plaques.
- Autoimmunity against type V collagen is associated with lung transplant failure.

Diagnostic uses of Collagen V:

- Degradation products of Collagen V have shown to be a useful noninvasive serum biomarker for assessing progression and resolution in experimental hepatic fibrosis.

== Genes ==
- COL5A1, COL5A2, COL5A3
