= CCN protein =

Family of proteins

CCN proteins are a family of extracellular matrix (ECM)-associated proteins involved in intercellular signaling. Due to their dynamic role within the ECM they are considered matricellular proteins.

== Background ==
The acronym CCN is derived from the first three members of the family discovered, namely CYR61 (cysteine-rich angiogenic protein 61 or CCN1), CTGF (connective tissue growth factor or CCN2), and NOV (nephroblastoma overexpressed or CCN3). Together with three Wnt-induced secreted proteins, they comprise the CCN family of matricellular proteins. These proteins have now been renamed CCN1-6 by international consensus. Members of the CCN protein family are characterized by having four conserved cysteine-rich domains, which include the insulin-like growth factor-binding domain (IGFBP), the Von Willebrand factor type C domain (VWC), the thrombospondin type 1 repeat (TSR), and a C-terminal domain (CT) with a cysteine knot motif. CCN proteins have been shown to play important roles in many cellular processes, including cell adhesion, migration, proliferation, differentiation, survival, apoptosis, and senescence. They are also involved in biological processes including angiogenesis, inflammation, fibrosis, wound healing and tumorigenesis. CCN proteins likely constitute a hub for the coordination of cell signaling and communication.

== Members ==
The CCN protein family includes the following six proteins:

- CCN1: CYR61 (cysteine-rich angiogenic protein 61)
- CCN2: CTGF (connective tissue growth factor)
- CCN3: NOV (nephroblastoma overexpressed)
- CCN4: WISP1 (WNT1 inducible signaling pathway protein-1)
- CCN5: WISP2 (WNT1 inducible signaling pathway protein-2)
- CCN6: WISP3 (WNT1 inducible signaling pathway protein-3)
