= Von Willebrand factor type C domain =

von Willebrand factor type C domain

Identifiers
- Symbol: VWC
- Pfam: PF00093
- InterPro: IPR001007
Available protein structures:
- PDB: IPR001007 PF00093 (ECOD; PDBsum)
- AlphaFold: IPR001007; PF00093

Von Willebrand factor, type C (VWFC or VWC)is a protein domain is found in various blood plasma proteins: complement factors B, C2, CR3 and CR4; the integrins (I-domains); collagen types VI, VII, XII and XIV; and other extracellular proteins.

== Function ==
Although the majority of VWA-containing proteins are extracellular, the most ancient ones present in all eukaryotes are all intracellular proteins involved in functions such as transcription, DNA repair, ribosomal and membrane transport and the proteasome.

A common feature appears to be involvement in multiprotein complexes. Proteins that incorporate vWF domains participate in numerous biological events (e.g. cell adhesion, migration, homing, pattern formation, and signal transduction), involving interaction with a large array of ligands.

== Mutation effects ==
A number of human diseases arise from mutations in VWA domains.

The domain is named after the von Willebrand factor (VWF) type C repeat which is found in multidomain protein/multifunctional proteins involved in maintaining homeostasis. For the von Willebrand factor the duplicated VWFC domain is thought to participate in oligomerization, but not in the initial dimerization step. The presence of this region in a number of other complex-forming proteins points to the possible involvement of the VWFC domain in complex formation.

== Human proteins containing this domain ==
- BMP binding endothelial regulator (BMPER)
- Cysteine-rich motor neuron 1 protein (CRIM1)
- Extracellular matrix protein 2 (ECM2)
- Fraser extracellular matrix complex subunit 1 (FRAS1)
- Neural EGFL like 1 (NELL1)
- Neural EGFL like 2 (NELL2)
- Peroxidasin like (PXDNL)
- Von Willebrand factor C and EGF domain-containing protein (VWCE)
- Von Willebrand factor (VWF)

=== Chordin family ===
- Chordin (CHRD)
- Chordin-like 1 (CHRDL1)
- Chordin-like 2 (CHRDL2)
- Brorin (VWC2)

=== Collagen family ===
- Collagen, type I, alpha 1 (COL1A1)
- Collagen, type II, alpha 1 (COL2A1)
- Collagen, type III, alpha 1 (COL3A1)
- Collagen, type V, alpha 2 (COL5A2)

=== Mucin family ===
- Mucin 2 (MUC2)
- Mucin 5B (MUC5B)

=== Thrombospondin superfamily ===
- Thrombospondin 1 (THBS1)
- Thrombospondin 2 (THBS2)
- SCO-spondin (SSPO)

==== CCN family ====
- CCN1: Cysteine-rich angiogenic inducer 61 (CYR61)
- CCN2: Connective tissue growth factor (CTGF)
- CCN3: Nephroblastoma overexpressed (NOV)
- CCN4: WNT1-inducible-signaling pathway protein 1 (WISP1)
- CCN5: WNT1-inducible-signaling pathway protein 2 (WISP2)
