= Protein Wnt-6 =

InterPro Family

WNT6

Identifiers
- Aliases: WNT6, Wnt family member 6
- External IDs: OMIM: 604663; MGI: 98960; GeneCards: WNT6

Gene location (Human)
Chr.	Chromosome 2 (human)
Band	2q35	Start	218,859,805 bp
Band	2q35	End	218,874,233 bp

Gene location (Mouse)
Chr.	Chromosome 1 (mouse)
Band	1|1 C4	Start	74,811,051 bp
Band	1|1 C4	End	74,824,481 bp
RNA expression pattern
Bgee	Human / Mouse (ortholog); Top expressed in: tibial nerve; sural nerve; putamen; apex of heart; caudate nucleus; muscle layer of sigmoid colon; decidua; spleen; nucleus accumbens; gastric mucosa / Top expressed in: lumbar spinal ganglion; molar; gastrula; prostatic epithelium; Gonadal ridge; anterior lobe of prostate; epithelium of male urethra; lamina propria of prostatic urethra; maxillary prominence; epithelium of female urethra; More reference expression data
BioGPS	n/a
Gene ontology
Molecular function	frizzled binding; signaling receptor binding
Cellular component	extracellular region; endoplasmic reticulum lumen; endocytic vesicle membrane; Golgi lumen; cell surface; plasma membrane; extracellular exosome; extracellular space; extracellular matrix
Biological process	positive regulation of tooth mineralization; nephron tubule development; axis specification; epithelial-mesenchymal cell signaling; multicellular organism development; nephron tubule formation; cornea development in camera-type eye; cellular response to retinoic acid; positive regulation of transcription, DNA-templated; cell fate commitment; branching involved in ureteric bud morphogenesis; odontogenesis of dentin-containing tooth; positive regulation of gene expression; neuron differentiation; Wnt signaling pathway
Sources:Amigo / QuickGO
Orthologs
Databases	NCBI: entry; OMA: entry
Species	Human	Mouse
Entrez	7475	22420
Ensembl	ENSG00000115596	ENSMUSG00000033227
UniProt	Q9Y6F9	P22727
RefSeq (mRNA)	NM_006522	NM_009526
RefSeq (protein)	NP_006513	NP_033552
Location (UCSC)	Chr 2: 218.86 – 218.87 Mb	Chr 1: 74.81 – 74.82 Mb
PubMed search
- Wikidata
View/Edit Human	View/Edit Mouse

Protein Wnt-6, is a protein that in humans is encoded by the WNT6 gene.

The WNT gene family consists of structurally related genes that encode secreted signaling proteins. These proteins have been implicated in oncogenesis and in several developmental processes, including regulation of cell fate and patterning during embryogenesis. This gene is a member of the WNT gene family, which are involved in the Wnt signaling pathway. It is overexpressed in cervical cancer cell line and strongly coexpressed with another family member, WNT10A, in colorectal cancer cell line. The gene overexpression may play key roles in carcinogenesis. This gene and the WNT10A gene are clustered in the chromosome 2q35 region. The protein encoded by this gene is 97% identical to the mouse Wnt6 protein at the amino acid level.

== Role in development ==
Wnt-6 plays a role in the formation and maturation of different embryonic structures, namely the fetal heart, ventral body wall, and somite derived structures. Wnt6, through the canonical Wnt signaling pathway, inhibits the induction of cardiogenic mesoderm. For this reason, Wnt6 inhibitors like Cerberus must be present to allow the cells to be induced. Knockout models show that without Wnt6 the fetus develops an enlarged heart, while upregulating Wnt6 results in the heart being underdeveloped. Several Wnts, including Wnt6, have shown to be involved in the formation of the ventral body wall and when inhibited result in birth defects such as failure of the wall to close, hypoplasia of the musculature, and other defects. Following the formation of the somites from the Paraxial Mesoderm, the outermost cells of the somites undergo a mesenchymal to epithelial transition. Wnt-6 is expressed by the overlying ectoderm and promotes the production of Paraxis, which facilitates the transition. While many structures will still form if Wnt6 is knocked out, the structures (ribs, vertebra, and muscles) are fused and not organized properly. On the other hand, if Wnt6 is upregulated, muscle in the limbs and surrounding areas are decreased as the mesenchymal progenitor cells that migrate and become the muscle are locked in the somite as epithelial cells.
