= Collagen, type V, alpha 1 =

Protein found in humans

COL5A1
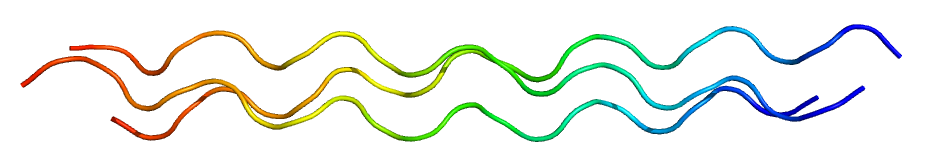

Identifiers
- Aliases: COL5A1, EDSC, collagen type V alpha 1, collagen type V alpha 1 chain, EDSCL1, FMDMF
- External IDs: OMIM: 120215; MGI: 88457; GeneCards: COL5A1
Available structures
PDB	Ortholog search: PDBe RCSB
PDB	List of PDB id codes 1A89, 1A9A

Gene location (Human)
Chr.	Chromosome 9 (human)
Band	9q34.3	Start	134,641,803 bp
Band	9q34.3	End	134,844,843 bp

Gene location (Mouse)
Chr.	Chromosome 2 (mouse)
Band	2 A3|2 19.38 cM	Start	27,776,437 bp
Band	2 A3|2 19.38 cM	End	27,929,526 bp
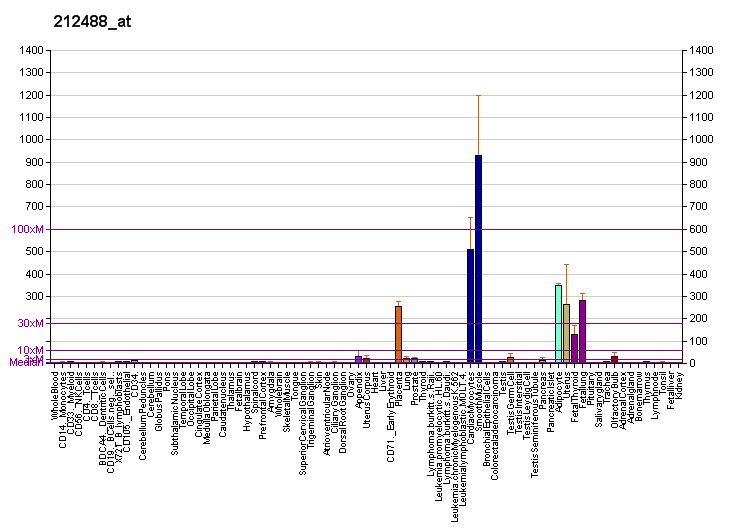

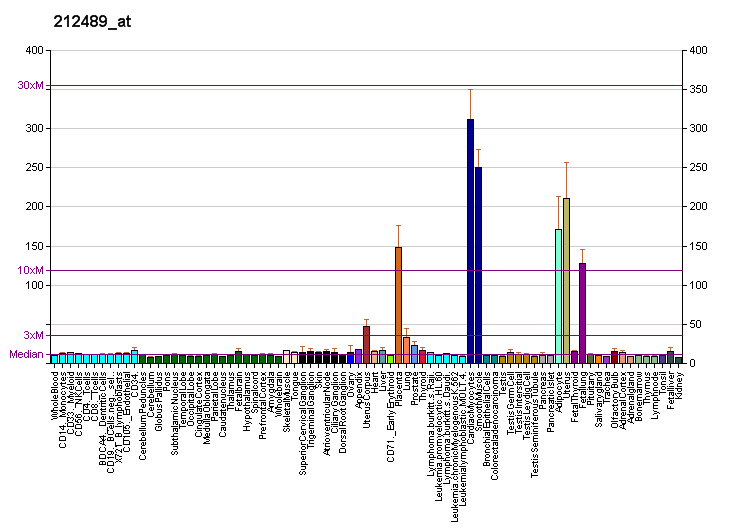

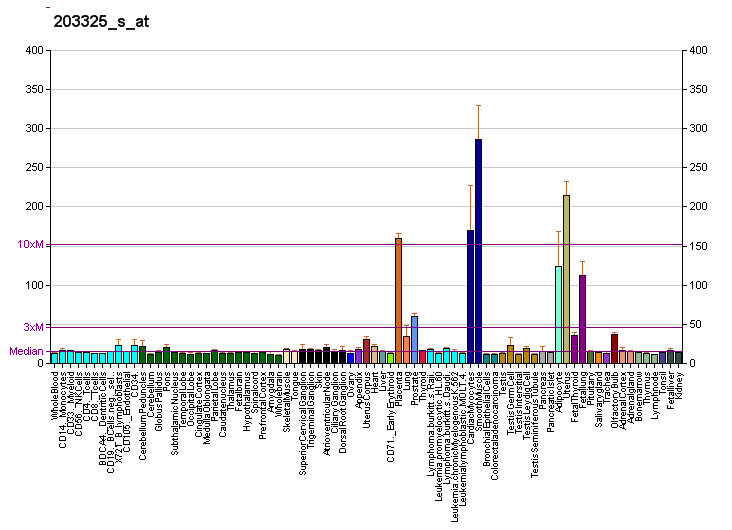
RNA expression pattern
Bgee	Human / Mouse (ortholog); Top expressed in: stromal cell of endometrium; periodontal fiber; tendon of biceps brachii; canal of the cervix; tibia; cartilage tissue; body of uterus; sural nerve; skin of hip; myometrium / Top expressed in: umbilical cord; calvaria; internal carotid artery; efferent ductule; external carotid artery; vas deferens; body of femur; ascending aorta; dermis; fossa; More reference expression data
BioGPS	More reference expression data
Gene ontology
Molecular function	extracellular matrix structural constituent; metal ion binding; integrin binding; platelet-derived growth factor binding; proteoglycan binding; heparin binding; protein binding; extracellular matrix structural constituent conferring tensile strength
Cellular component	collagen; endoplasmic reticulum lumen; collagen type V trimer; basement membrane; extracellular exosome; extracellular matrix; extracellular space; extracellular region; collagen-containing extracellular matrix
Biological process	eye morphogenesis; negative regulation of endodermal cell differentiation; tendon development; wound healing, spreading of epidermal cells; integrin biosynthetic process; heart morphogenesis; regulation of cellular component organization; extracellular matrix organization; cell adhesion; blood vessel development; collagen biosynthetic process; collagen catabolic process; cell migration; skin development; collagen fibril organization; supramolecular fiber organization
Sources:Amigo / QuickGO
Orthologs
Databases	NCBI: entry; OMA: entry
Species	Human	Mouse
Entrez	1289	12831
Ensembl	ENSG00000130635	ENSMUSG00000026837
UniProt	P20908	O88207
RefSeq (mRNA)	NM_000093; NM_001278074	NM_015734
RefSeq (protein)	NP_000084; NP_001265003	NP_056549
Location (UCSC)	Chr 9: 134.64 – 134.84 Mb	Chr 2: 27.78 – 27.93 Mb
PubMed search
- Wikidata
View/Edit Human	View/Edit Mouse

Collagen alpha-1(V) chain is a protein that in humans is encoded by the COL5A1 gene.

This gene encodes an alpha chain for one of the low abundance fibrillar collagens. Fibrillar collagen molecules are trimers that can be composed of one or more types of alpha chains. Type V collagen is found in tissues containing type I collagen and appears to regulate the assembly of heterotypic fibers composed of both type I and type V collagen. This gene product is closely related to type XI collagen and it is possible that the collagen chains of types V and XI constitute a single collagen type with tissue-specific chain combinations. Mutations in this gene are associated with Ehlers–Danlos syndrome, types I and II.

== See also ==
- Type V collagen
