= Ctgf/hcs24 CAESAR =

ctgf/hcs24 CAESAR
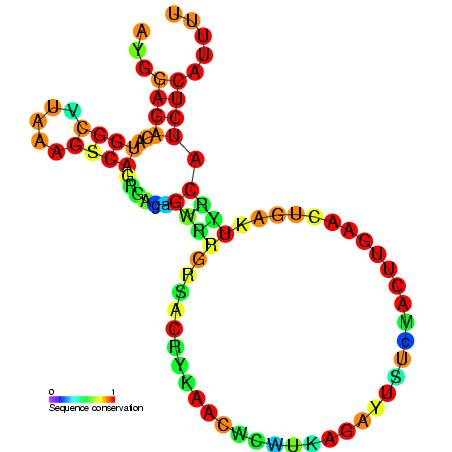
- Predicted secondary structure and sequence conservation of CAESAR

Identifiers
- Symbol: CAESAR
- Rfam: RF00172

Other data
- RNA type: Cis-reg
- Domain(s): Eukaryota
- SO: SO:0000233
- PDB structures: PDBe

ctgf/hcs24 CAESAR is the name given to the cis-acting RNA element identified in the 3' untranslated region (3'UTR) of the human connective tissue growth factor (CTGF) messenger RNA. This gene is also known as hypertrophic chondrocyte specific 24 (hcs24).

The importance of the 3'UTR in repressing ctgf gene expression was initially characacterised and subsequently the minimal RNA element responsible for repression was identified This element was predicted to form a stable secondary structure, which acts as a post-transcriptional cis-acting element of structure-anchored repression (CAESAR).

The 3'UTR of the ctgf/hcs24 gene in chicken has also been shown to be involved in repression of gene expression.
