= WNT10A =

Protein-coding gene in the species Homo sapiens

Identifiers
- Aliases: WNT10A, OODD, SSPS, STHAG4, Wnt family member 10A
- External IDs: OMIM: 606268; MGI: 108071; GeneCards: WNT10A

Gene location (Human)
Chr.	Chromosome 2 (human)
Band	2q35	Start	218,880,852 bp
Band	2q35	End	218,899,581 bp

Gene location (Mouse)
Chr.	Chromosome 1 (mouse)
Band	1|1 C4	Start	74,830,675 bp
Band	1|1 C4	End	74,843,338 bp
RNA expression pattern
Bgee	Human / Mouse (ortholog); Top expressed in: gonad; bone marrow cell; skin of abdomen; skin of leg; granulocyte; lymph node; pituitary gland; mucosa of transverse colon; olfactory zone of nasal mucosa; anterior pituitary / Top expressed in: tooth; molar; prostatic epithelium; inner root sheath; gastrula; epithelium of male urethra; enamel knot; lip; urethral gland (male); corneal stroma; More reference expression data
BioGPS	n/a
Gene ontology
Molecular function	frizzled binding; signaling receptor binding; receptor ligand activity
Cellular component	extracellular region; extracellular space
Biological process	skin development; odontogenesis; tongue development; hair follicle development; positive regulation of gene expression; regulation of odontogenesis of dentin-containing tooth; multicellular organism development; neural crest cell differentiation; neuron differentiation; epidermis morphogenesis; hair follicle morphogenesis; cell fate commitment; cellular response to transforming growth factor beta stimulus; sebaceous gland development; Wnt signaling pathway; regulation of signaling receptor activity; canonical Wnt signaling pathway
Sources:Amigo / QuickGO
Orthologs
Databases	NCBI: entry; OMA: entry
Species	Human	Mouse
Entrez	80326	22409
Ensembl	ENSG00000135925	ENSMUSG00000026167
UniProt	Q9GZT5	P70701
RefSeq (mRNA)	NM_025216	NM_009518
RefSeq (protein)	NP_079492	NP_033544
Location (UCSC)	Chr 2: 218.88 – 218.9 Mb	Chr 1: 74.83 – 74.84 Mb
PubMed search
- Wikidata
View/Edit Human	View/Edit Mouse

Wnt-10a is a protein that in humans is encoded by the WNT10A gene.

== Function ==
The WNT gene family consists of structurally related genes which encode secreted signaling proteins. These proteins have been implicated in oncogenesis and in several developmental processes, including regulation of cell fate and patterning during embryogenesis. This gene is a member of the WNT gene family.

== Clinical significance ==
WNT10A is strongly expressed in the cell lines of promyelocytic leukemia and Burkitt's lymphoma. In addition, it and another family member, the WNT6 gene, are strongly coexpressed in colorectal cancer cell lines. The gene overexpression may play key roles in carcinogenesis through activation of the WNT-beta-catenin-TCF signaling pathway. This gene and the WNT6 gene are clustered in the chromosome 2q35 region.

Mutations in the WNT10A gene are associated with Schöpf–Schulz–Passarge syndrome, hypodontia, and short anagen hair syndrome.
