= Extracellular matrix protein 2 =

Protein-coding gene in the species Homo sapiens

ECM2

Identifiers
- Aliases: ECM2, extracellular matrix protein 2
- External IDs: OMIM: 603479; MGI: 3039578; GeneCards: ECM2

Gene location (Human)
Chr.	Chromosome 9 (human)
Band	9q22.31	Start	92,493,554 bp
Band	9q22.31	End	92,536,655 bp

Gene location (Mouse)
Chr.	Chromosome 13 (mouse)
Band	13|13 A5	Start	49,658,286 bp
Band	13|13 A5	End	49,686,265 bp
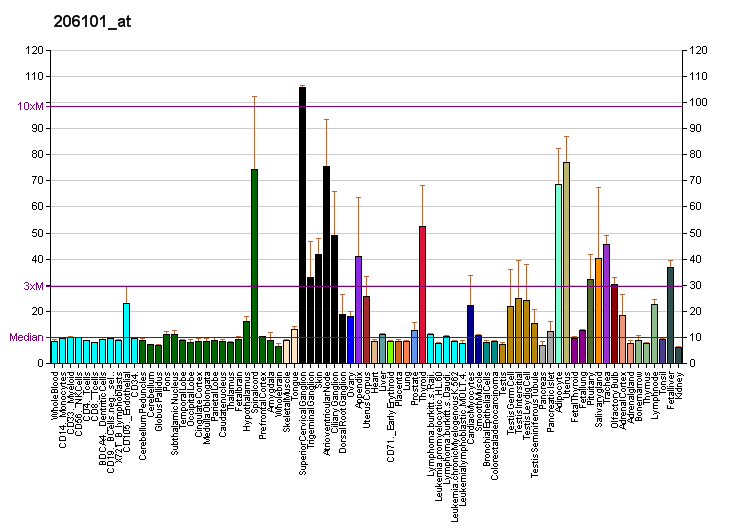
RNA expression pattern
Bgee	Human / Mouse (ortholog); Top expressed in: Achilles tendon; synovial joint; right coronary artery; parietal pleura; skin of hip; tibia; vena cava; germinal epithelium; Descending thoracic aorta; ascending aorta / Top expressed in: esophagus; aorta; muscle of thigh; ascending aorta; lumbar spinal ganglion; lip; extraocular muscle; aortic valve; interventricular septum; soleus muscle; More reference expression data
BioGPS	More reference expression data
Gene ontology
Molecular function	collagen V binding; integrin binding; heparin binding; collagen binding
Cellular component	extracellular region; interstitial matrix; extracellular space; extracellular matrix
Biological process	cell-matrix adhesion; extracellular matrix organization; axonogenesis; positive regulation of cell-substrate adhesion
Sources:Amigo / QuickGO
Orthologs
Databases	NCBI: entry; OMA: entry
Species	Human	Mouse
Entrez	1842	407800
Ensembl	ENSG00000106823	ENSMUSG00000043631
UniProt	O94769	Q5FW85
RefSeq (mRNA)	NM_001393; NM_001197295; NM_001197296	NM_001012324
RefSeq (protein)	NP_001184224; NP_001184225; NP_001384	NP_001012324
Location (UCSC)	Chr 9: 92.49 – 92.54 Mb	Chr 13: 49.66 – 49.69 Mb
PubMed search
- Wikidata
View/Edit Human	View/Edit Mouse

Extracellular matrix protein 2 is a protein that in humans is encoded by the ECM2 gene.

ECM2 encodes extracellular matrix protein 2, so named because it shares extensive similarity with known extracellular matrix proteins.
