= DAAM1 =

Protein-coding gene in the species Homo sapiens

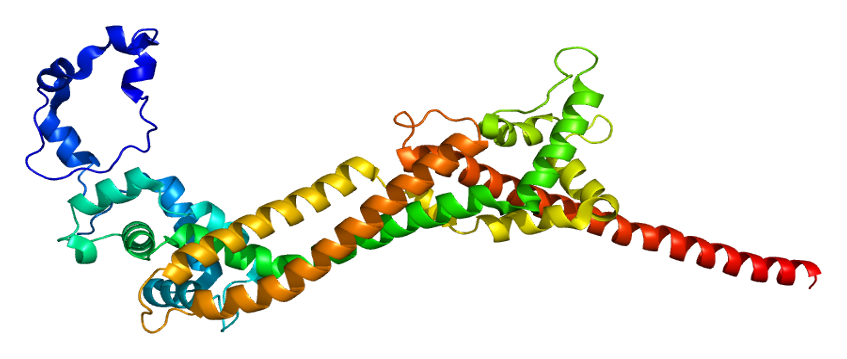

Identifiers
- Aliases: DAAM1, dishevelled associated activator of morphogenesis 1
- External IDs: OMIM: 606626; MGI: 1914596; GeneCards: DAAM1
Available structures
PDB	Ortholog search: PDBe RCSB
PDB	List of PDB id codes 2J1D, 2Z6E

Gene location (Human)
Chr.	Chromosome 14 (human)
Band	14q23.1	Start	59,188,646 bp
Band	14q23.1	End	59,371,405 bp

Gene location (Mouse)
Chr.	Chromosome 12 (mouse)
Band	12|12 C3	Start	71,877,852 bp
Band	12|12 C3	End	72,039,107 bp
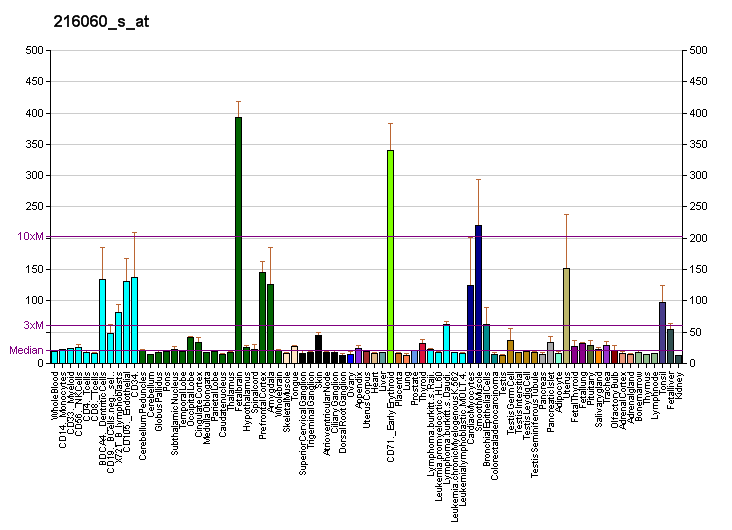
RNA expression pattern
Bgee	Human / Mouse (ortholog); Top expressed in: oocyte; secondary oocyte; retinal pigment epithelium; nipple; skin of arm; human penis; skin of thigh; skin of hip; vulva; saphenous vein / Top expressed in: otolith organ; utricle; ciliary body; atrioventricular valve; secondary oocyte; epithelium of lens; primary oocyte; zygote; hand; iris; More reference expression data
BioGPS	More reference expression data
Gene ontology
Molecular function	actin binding; protein binding; identical protein binding
Cellular component	plasma membrane; membrane; stress fiber; ciliary basal body; motile cilium; cytoplasm; cytosol; cytoskeleton; cell projection
Biological process	actin cytoskeleton organization; cellular component organization; Wnt signaling pathway, planar cell polarity pathway; Wnt signaling pathway
Sources:Amigo / QuickGO
Orthologs
Databases	NCBI: entry; OMA: entry
Species	Human	Mouse
Entrez	23002	208846
Ensembl	ENSG00000100592	ENSMUSG00000034574
UniProt	Q9Y4D1	Q8BPM0
RefSeq (mRNA)	NM_001270520; NM_014992	NM_001286452; NM_026102; NM_172464
RefSeq (protein)	NP_001257449; NP_055807	NP_001273381; NP_080378; NP_766052
Location (UCSC)	Chr 14: 59.19 – 59.37 Mb	Chr 12: 71.88 – 72.04 Mb
PubMed search
- Wikidata
View/Edit Human	View/Edit Mouse

Dishevelled-associated activator of morphogenesis 1 is a protein that in humans is encoded by the DAAM1 gene. Evidence of alternative splicing has been observed for this gene but the full-length nature of these variants has not been determined.

== Function ==
Cell motility, adhesion, and cytokinesis, and other functions of the cell cortex are mediated by the reorganization of the actin cytoskeleton and recent evidence suggests a role for formin homology (FH) proteins in these processes. The protein encoded by this gene contains FH domains and belongs to a novel FH protein subfamily implicated in cell polarity. Wnt/Fz signaling activates the small GTPase Rho, a key regulator of cytoskeleton architecture, to control cell polarity and movement during development. Activation requires Dvl-Rho complex formation, an assembly mediated by this gene product, which is thought to function as a scaffolding protein.

== Clinical significance ==
The deletion of a single copy of this gene has been associated with congenital heart defects.
