= WNT8A =

Protein-coding gene in the species Homo sapiens

Identifiers
- Aliases: WNT8A, WNT8D, Wnt family member 8A
- External IDs: OMIM: 606360; MGI: 107924; GeneCards: WNT8A

Gene location (Human)
Chr.	Chromosome 5 (human)
Band	5q31.2	Start	138,083,990 bp
Band	5q31.2	End	138,092,365 bp

Gene location (Mouse)
Chr.	Chromosome 18 (mouse)
Band	18|18 B1	Start	34,675,366 bp
Band	18|18 B1	End	34,681,326 bp
RNA expression pattern
Bgee	Human / Mouse (ortholog); Top expressed in: gonad; nucleus accumbens; putamen; caudate nucleus; Brodmann area 9; prefrontal cortex; right frontal lobe; cerebellum; cerebellar hemisphere; anterior cingulate cortex / Top expressed in: primitive streak; corneal epithelium; epiblast; set of lens fibers; embryo; hair; main bronchus; corneal endothelium; embryo; pretectal area; More reference expression data
BioGPS	n/a
Gene ontology
Molecular function	signaling receptor binding; frizzled binding; receptor ligand activity
Cellular component	extracellular region; extracellular space; extracellular matrix; collagen-containing extracellular matrix
Biological process	canonical Wnt signaling pathway involved in neural crest cell differentiation; multicellular organism development; response to retinoic acid; neural crest cell fate commitment; neuron differentiation; canonical Wnt signaling pathway involved in cardiac muscle cell fate commitment; beta-catenin destruction complex disassembly; Wnt signaling pathway; canonical Wnt signaling pathway; regulation of signaling receptor activity; secondary palate development; cell fate commitment
Sources:Amigo / QuickGO
Orthologs
Databases	NCBI: entry; OMA: entry
Species	Human	Mouse
Entrez	7478	20890
Ensembl	ENSG00000061492	ENSMUSG00000012282
UniProt	Q9H1J5	Q64527
RefSeq (mRNA)	NM_001300938; NM_001300939; NM_031933; NM_058244	NM_009290
RefSeq (protein)	NP_001287867; NP_001287868; NP_490645	NP_033316
Location (UCSC)	Chr 5: 138.08 – 138.09 Mb	Chr 18: 34.68 – 34.68 Mb
PubMed search
- Wikidata
View/Edit Human	View/Edit Mouse

Protein Wnt-8a is a protein that in humans is encoded by the WNT8A gene. Wnt8a may be involved in the development of early embryos as well as germ cell tumors.

== Function ==
The Wnt8a gene is part of the Wnt family of genes and plays a role in vertebrates in the process of axis patterning. Wnt8a encodes for 2 proteins, Wnt8a.1 and Wnt8a.2 via a complicated mechanism involving the coordination of signaling molecules to control up and down stream promoters. Furthermore, Wnt8a has shown to play a role in neural crest induction via Wnt/𝜷-catenin signaling based on experiments using zebrafish as a model organism. Wnt8a among other Wnt genes influence the Wnt/𝜷-catenin signaling in neural crest development. 𝜷-catenin is degraded in the absence of a Wnt signaling, but upon the binding of a Wnt ligand with a frizzled receptor and Lrp5/6 the 𝜷-catenin signaling molecule is no longer degraded. Instead, it interacts with transcription factors that activate Wnt expression, of which, Wnt8 is crucial for neural crest development and other cell fates. In a study of morpholino based gene knockdown in zebrafish, knocking down Wnt8a resulted in the lack of expression of various other genes important for neural crest induction (pax3, sox10, and foxd3). It is unclear however, if the loss of these neural crest specifiers is a result of Wnt8a directly in the induction process or is a downstream consequence of disruptions in Wnt8a signaling earlier in development. Regardless, the results of this study show Wnt8a as a key player in neural crest induction.
