= Collagen, type V, alpha 2 =

Protein found in humans

COL5A2

Identifiers
- Aliases: COL5A2, EDSC, collagen type V alpha 2, collagen type V alpha 2 chain, EDSCL2
- External IDs: OMIM: 120190; MGI: 88458; GeneCards: COL5A2
Available structures
PDB	Ortholog search: PDBe RCSB
PDB	List of PDB id codes 1A9A

Gene location (Human)
Chr.	Chromosome 2 (human)
Band	2q32.2	Start	189,031,898 bp
Band	2q32.2	End	189,225,312 bp

Gene location (Mouse)
Chr.	Chromosome 1 (mouse)
Band	1|1 C1.1	Start	45,413,481 bp
Band	1|1 C1.1	End	45,542,442 bp
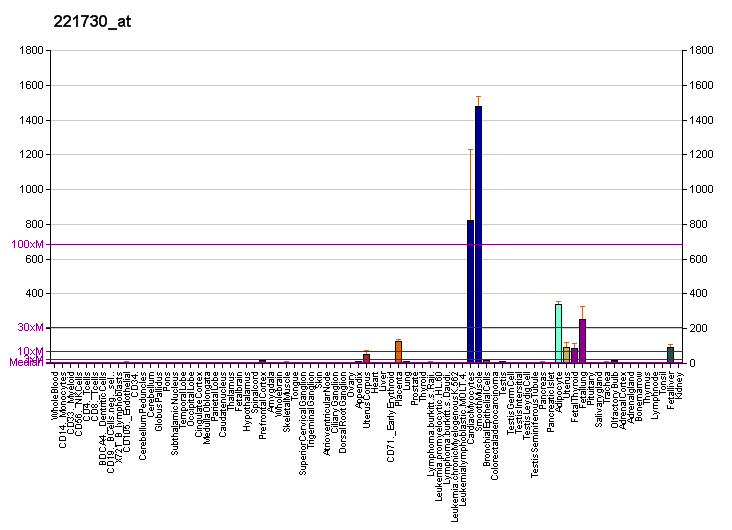

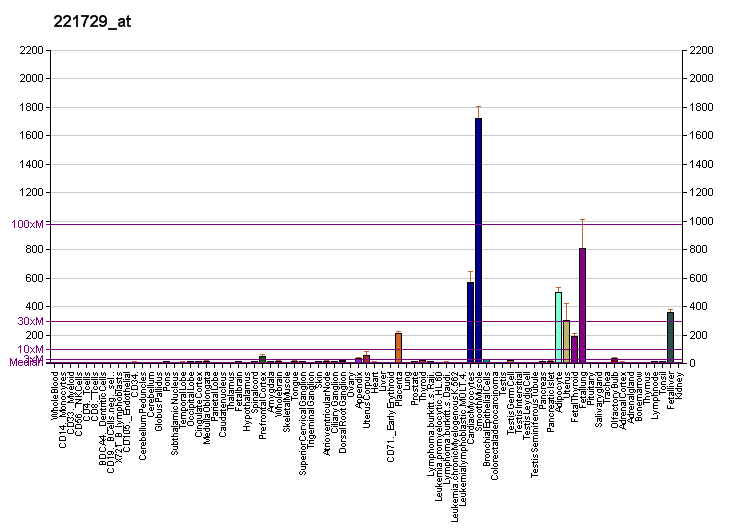
RNA expression pattern
Bgee	Human / Mouse (ortholog); Top expressed in: tendon of biceps brachii; periodontal fiber; stromal cell of endometrium; skin of hip; tibia; cartilage tissue; visceral pleura; parietal pleura; synovial joint; smooth muscle tissue / Top expressed in: calvaria; body of femur; fossa; stroma of bone marrow; dermis; molar; efferent ductule; decidua; condyle; human fetus; More reference expression data
BioGPS	More reference expression data
Gene ontology
Molecular function	metal ion binding; extracellular matrix structural constituent; SMAD binding; molecular function; extracellular matrix structural constituent conferring tensile strength
Cellular component	extracellular region; endoplasmic reticulum lumen; collagen; collagen type V trimer; extracellular matrix; extracellular space; collagen-containing extracellular matrix
Biological process	eye morphogenesis; skeletal system development; collagen catabolic process; ossification; extracellular matrix organization; cellular response to amino acid stimulus; negative regulation of endodermal cell differentiation; skin development; collagen fibril organization; notochord development
Sources:Amigo / QuickGO
Orthologs
Databases	NCBI: entry; OMA: entry
Species	Human	Mouse
Entrez	1290	12832
Ensembl	ENSG00000204262	ENSMUSG00000026042
UniProt	P05997	Q3U962
RefSeq (mRNA)	NM_000393	NM_007737; NM_172972
RefSeq (protein)	NP_000384	NP_031763
Location (UCSC)	Chr 2: 189.03 – 189.23 Mb	Chr 1: 45.41 – 45.54 Mb
PubMed search
- Wikidata
View/Edit Human	View/Edit Mouse

Collagen alpha-2(V) chain is a protein that in humans is encoded by the COL5A2 gene.

This gene encodes an alpha chain for one of the low abundance fibrillar collagens. Fibrillar collagen molecules are trimers that can be composed of one or more types of alpha chains. Type V collagen is found in tissues containing type I collagen and appears to regulate the assembly of heterotypic fibers composed of both type I and type V collagen. This gene product is closely related to type XI collagen and it is possible that the collagen chains of types V and XI constitute a single collagen type with tissue-specific chain combinations. Mutations in this gene are associated with Ehlers–Danlos syndrome, classical type, formerly known as types I and II.

== See also ==
- Type V collagen
