= CCN family member 4 =

Protein-coding gene in humans

CCN4

Identifiers
- Aliases: CCN4, WISP1c, WISP1i, WISP1tc, WNT1 inducible signaling pathway protein 1, WISP1-OT1, WISP1-UT1, cellular communication network factor 4, WISP1
- External IDs: OMIM: 603398; MGI: 1197008; GeneCards: CCN4

Gene location (Human)
Chr.	Chromosome 8 (human)
Band	8q24.22	Start	133,191,039 bp
Band	8q24.22	End	133,231,690 bp

Gene location (Mouse)
Chr.	Chromosome 15 (mouse)
Band	15 D2|15 29.3 cM	Start	66,763,169 bp
Band	15 D2|15 29.3 cM	End	66,795,050 bp
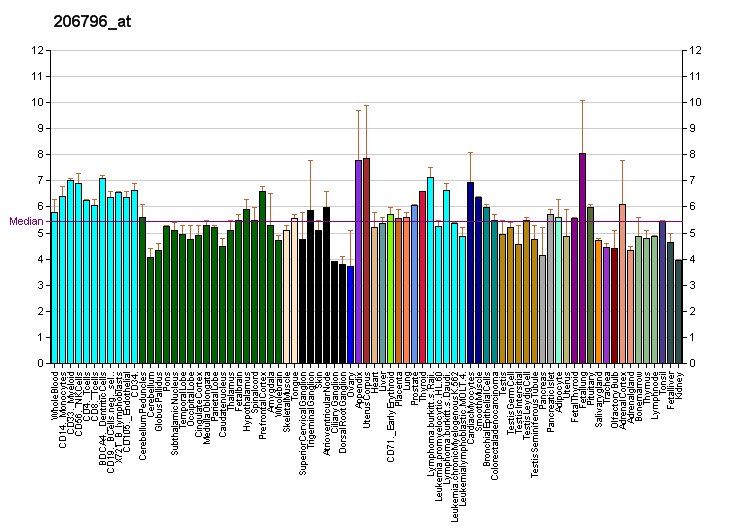

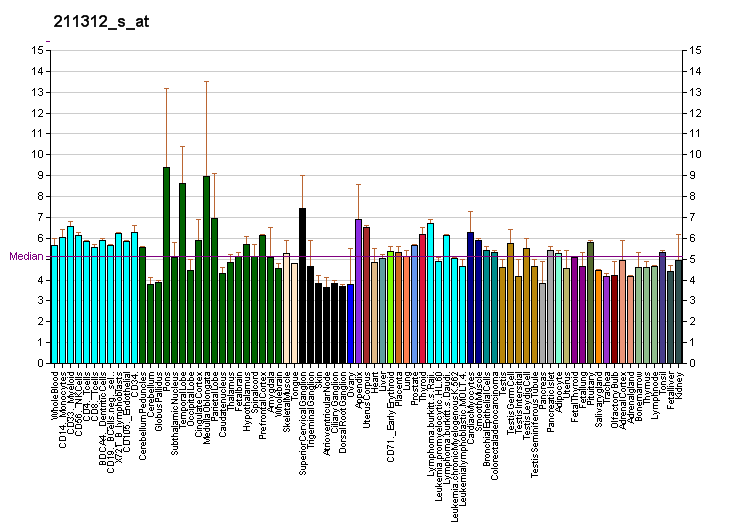
RNA expression pattern
Bgee	Human / Mouse (ortholog); Top expressed in: cartilage tissue; tibia; mucosa of paranasal sinus; testicle; visceral pleura; smooth muscle tissue; left adrenal cortex; myometrium; body of uterus; saphenous vein / Top expressed in: molar; body of femur; calvaria; atrium; basilar part of occipital bone; facial skeleton; lumbar spinal ganglion; efferent ductule; Gonadal ridge; membranous bone; More reference expression data
BioGPS	More reference expression data
Gene ontology
Molecular function	insulin-like growth factor binding; integrin binding; heparin binding; protein binding
Cellular component	extracellular region; cytosol; extracellular space; extracellular matrix; cytoplasm
Biological process	Wnt signaling pathway; regulation of cell growth; signal transduction; cell-cell signaling; cell adhesion; negative regulation of cell death; osteoblast differentiation; positive regulation of smooth muscle cell migration; positive regulation of Wnt signaling pathway; osteoclast differentiation; negative regulation of chondrocyte differentiation; glucose homeostasis; negative regulation of fat cell differentiation; positive regulation of osteoblast differentiation; positive regulation of smooth muscle cell proliferation; positive regulation of inflammatory response; bone development; positive regulation of wound healing
Sources:Amigo / QuickGO
Orthologs
Databases	NCBI: entry; OMA: entry
Species	Human	Mouse
Entrez	8840	22402
Ensembl	ENSG00000104415	ENSMUSG00000005124
UniProt	O95388	O54775
RefSeq (mRNA)	NM_001204869; NM_001204870; NM_003882; NM_080838	NM_018865
RefSeq (protein)	NP_001191798; NP_001191799; NP_003873; NP_543028	NP_061353
Location (UCSC)	Chr 8: 133.19 – 133.23 Mb	Chr 15: 66.76 – 66.8 Mb
PubMed search
- Wikidata
View/Edit Human	View/Edit Mouse

CCN family member 4, also known as WNT1-inducible-signaling pathway protein 1 (WISP-1), is a member of the CCN protein family. It is a matricellular protein that in humans is encoded by the CCN4 gene.

== Structure ==
CCN4/WISP-1 is highly homologous to CYR61 (CCN1) and CTGF (CCN2), and is a member of the CCN family of secreted, extracellular matrix (ECM)-associated signaling proteins (CCN intercellular signaling protein). The CCN family of proteins shares a common molecular protein structure, characterized by an N-terminal secretory signal peptide followed by four distinct domains with homologies to insulin-like growth factor binding protein (IGFBP), von Willebrand type C repeats (vWC), thrombospondin type 1 repeat (TSR), and a cysteine knot motif within the C-terminal (CT) domain. This family of proteins regulates diverse cellular functions, including cell adhesion, migration, proliferation, differentiation, and survival.

== Role in bone development ==
CCN4/WISP-1 promotes mesenchymal cell proliferation and osteoblastic differentiation, and represses chondrocytic differentiation. WISP-1 binds BMP2 and enhances BMP2 function in osteogenesis. These activities may be modulated by its direct binding to decorin and biglycan, two members of a family of small leucine-rich proteoglycans present in the extracellular matrix of connective tissue.

== Clinical significance ==
In cells CCN4 has a range of actions including stimulating cell migration and cell proliferation and is a pro-survival factor. These effects appear to be conserved across a range of cell types including vascular smooth muscle cells, monocytes, fibroblasts and cancer cell lines. The effects are also preserved across species from mouse and rat to human cells studied in vitro.

=== Cancer ===
Expression of CCN4 promotes tumor growth, and high CCN4 expression correlates with advanced tumors of the brain, breast, colon, and lung. CCN4 appears to inhibit metastasis although expression of a CCN4 splicing variant lacking the VWC domain appears to enhance the invasive characteristic of gastric carcinoma cells.

=== Pulmonary fibrosis ===
Recombinant CCN4 enhances ECM deposition in human fibroblasts, suggesting that it might play a role in matrix remodeling in vivo. WISP-1 is upregulated in human patients with idiopathic pulmonary fibrosis and in a mouse model of bleomycin-induced lung fibrosis.

Orotracheal application of CCN4 neutralizing antibodies to the lung ameliorates bleomycin-induced lung fibrosis, raising the possibility that CCN4 might be a potential target for anti-fibrotic therapy.

=== Cardiac fibrosis ===
CCN4 activates human cardiac fibroblasts via integrin β1-Akt signaling pathway to induce collagen deposition and promote fibrosis. In a mouse model of cardiac fibrosis deletion of the CCN4 gene reduced the severity of fibrosis.

=== Myocardial injury ===
CCN4 attenuates p53-mediated apoptosis in response to DNA damage through activation of the Akt kinase, and inhibits TNF-induced cell death in cardiomyocytes.

=== Intimal thickening ===
In a mouse carotid artery ligation model of intimal thickening, deletion of the CCN4 gene reduced intimal thickening, while elevation of CCN4 using an adenovirus increased intimal thickening. Knocking out the CCN4 gene reduced the number of proliferating cells. Mouse aortic vascular smooth muscle cells in tissue culture addition of CCN4 increased cell migration and this effect was integrin dependent.

=== Atherosclerosis ===
In samples from atherosclerotic human coronary arteries unstable plaques had lower CCN4 compared to stable plaques. Loss of CCN4 resulted in more apoptosis, leading to loss of the plaque fibrous cap, increased lipid core size and more unstable plaque phenotype. Rupture of these unstable plaques can lead to plaque growth via incorporation of thrombus into a new layer of plaque. Using the high fat fed ApoE mouse model of atherosclerosis (created by) Jan Breslow), elevation of CCN4 using helper dependent adenovirus reduced apoptosis, number of macrophages and lipid core size and reduced atherosclerosis. Knocking out the CCN4 gene increased apoptosis and the severity of atherosclerosis.

=== Aortic aneurysm ===
In a mouse model of aortic aneurysm CCN4 increased the severity of aneurysms and increased cell proliferation in the wall of the aorta. Human blood monocytes in vitro migrated more following the addition of CCN4; and adhesion of the monocytes to a layer of human umbilical vein endothelial cells was also increased.
