= PYGO2 =

Protein-coding gene in humans

Identifiers
- Aliases: PYGO2, 1190004M21Rik, pygopus family PHD finger 2
- External IDs: OMIM: 606903; MGI: 1916161; GeneCards: PYGO2
Available structures
PDB	Human UniProt search: PDBe RCSB
PDB	List of PDB id codes 2XB1, 4UP0, 4UP5

Gene location (Human)
Chr.	Chromosome 1 (human)
Band	1q21.3	Start	154,957,026 bp
Band	1q21.3	End	154,963,853 bp

Gene location (Mouse)
Chr.	Chromosome 3 (mouse)
Band	3|3 F1	Start	89,337,521 bp
Band	3|3 F1	End	89,342,435 bp
RNA expression pattern
Bgee	Human / Mouse (ortholog); Top expressed in: skin of arm; cardiac muscle tissue of right atrium; myocardium of left ventricle; nasal epithelium; cardia; right adrenal gland; anterior pituitary; right adrenal cortex; granulocyte; oocyte / Top expressed in: papillary dermis; yolk sac; granulocyte; dermal papilla; cumulus cell; gastrula; ventricular zone; lens; epiblast; lip; More reference expression data
BioGPS	n/a
Gene ontology
Molecular function	histone binding; metal ion binding; protein binding; chromatin binding; histone acetyltransferase regulator activity
Cellular component	nucleoplasm; nucleus; beta-catenin-TCF complex
Biological process	roof of mouth development; regulation of histone H3-K4 methylation; in utero embryonic development; regulation of mammary gland epithelial cell proliferation; positive regulation of chromatin binding; mammary gland development; brain development; lens development in camera-type eye; developmental growth; regulation of histone acetylation; spermatid development; canonical Wnt signaling pathway; beta-catenin-TCF complex assembly; kidney development; spermatid nucleus differentiation; post-embryonic development; Wnt signaling pathway
Sources:Amigo / QuickGO
Orthologs
Databases	NCBI: entry; OMA: entry
Species	Human	Mouse
Entrez	90780	68911
Ensembl	ENSG00000163348	ENSMUSG00000047824
UniProt	Q9BRQ0	n/a
RefSeq (mRNA)	NM_138300	NM_001293763; NM_001293766; NM_001293767; NM_001293768; NM_026869
RefSeq (protein)	NP_612157	n/a
Location (UCSC)	Chr 1: 154.96 – 154.96 Mb	Chr 3: 89.34 – 89.34 Mb
PubMed search
- Wikidata
View/Edit Human	View/Edit Mouse

Pygopus homolog 2 is a protein that in humans is encoded by the PYGO2 gene.
