= CCN family member 2 =

Protein found in humans

CCN2

Identifiers
- Aliases: CCN2, HCS24, IGFBP8, NOV2, connective tissue growth factor, cellular communication network factor 2, CTGF
- External IDs: OMIM: 121009; MGI: 95537; GeneCards: CCN2

Gene location (Human)
Chr.	Chromosome 6 (human)
Band	6q23.2	Start	131,948,176 bp
Band	6q23.2	End	131,951,372 bp

Gene location (Mouse)
Chr.	Chromosome 10 (mouse)
Band	10 A4|10 11.84 cM	Start	24,471,340 bp
Band	10 A4|10 11.84 cM	End	24,474,581 bp
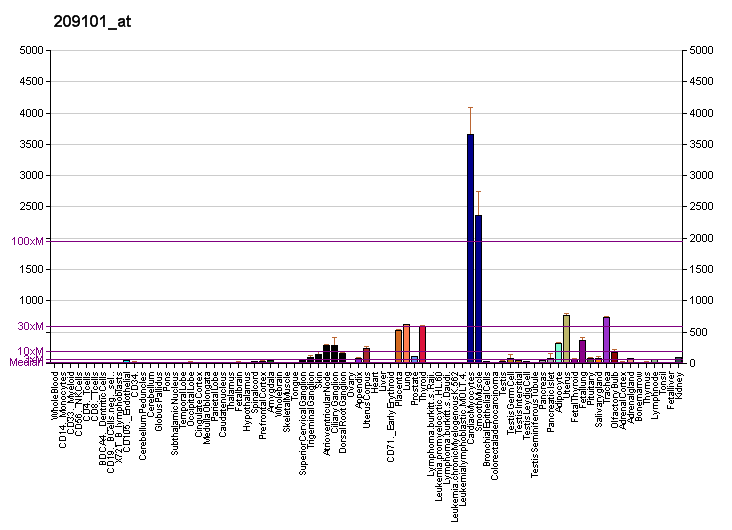
RNA expression pattern
Bgee	Human / Mouse (ortholog); Top expressed in: tibia; thoracic aorta; ascending aorta; smooth muscle tissue; gastric mucosa; right coronary artery; gallbladder; Descending thoracic aorta; left coronary artery; tendon of biceps brachii / Top expressed in: tunica media of zone of aorta; stroma of bone marrow; ascending aorta; semi-lunar valve; ankle joint; aortic valve; skin of external ear; ankle; ciliary body; epithelium of lens; More reference expression data
BioGPS	More reference expression data
Gene ontology
Molecular function	fibronectin binding; insulin-like growth factor binding; protein C-terminus binding; protein binding; growth factor activity; integrin binding; heparin binding
Cellular component	cytosol; cis-Golgi network; plasma membrane; extracellular region; cell cortex; perinuclear region of cytoplasm; extracellular space; extracellular matrix; collagen-containing extracellular matrix
Biological process	positive regulation of collagen biosynthetic process; positive regulation of cell activation; cell differentiation; regulation of chondrocyte differentiation; response to amino acid; response to estradiol; response to anoxia; intracellular signal transduction; response to mineralocorticoid; response to fatty acid; DNA biosynthetic process; positive regulation of cell death; ossification; response to organic cyclic compound; extracellular matrix constituent secretion; lung development; response to peptide hormone; positive regulation of G0 to G1 transition; positive regulation of JNK cascade; response to glucose; negative regulation of gene expression; reactive oxygen species metabolic process; fibroblast growth factor receptor signaling pathway; positive regulation of cysteine-type endopeptidase activity involved in apoptotic process; positive regulation of gene expression; connective tissue development; response to wounding; regulation of cell growth; angiogenesis; tissue homeostasis; positive regulation of cell population proliferation; chondrocyte proliferation; positive regulation of cell differentiation; epidermis development; positive regulation of cardiac muscle contraction; positive regulation of ERK1 and ERK2 cascade; positive regulation of protein phosphorylation; integrin-mediated signaling pathway; transcription initiation from RNA polymerase II promoter; cell-matrix adhesion; cell migration; cartilage condensation; positive regulation of stress fiber assembly; ageing; cell adhesion; cell-cell signaling; negative regulation of cell death; regulation of signaling receptor activity
Sources:Amigo / QuickGO
Orthologs
Databases	NCBI: entry; OMA: entry
Species	Human	Mouse
Entrez	1490	14219
Ensembl	ENSG00000118523	ENSMUSG00000019997
UniProt	P29279	P29268
RefSeq (mRNA)	NM_001901	NM_010217
RefSeq (protein)	NP_001892	NP_034347
Location (UCSC)	Chr 6: 131.95 – 131.95 Mb	Chr 10: 24.47 – 24.47 Mb
PubMed search
- Wikidata
View/Edit Human	View/Edit Mouse

CCN family member 2, also known as Connective tissue growth factor (CTGF), is a protein encoded by the CCN2 gene in humans. CTGF is a matricellular protein of the CCN family of extracellular matrix-associated heparin-binding proteins (see also CCN intercellular signaling protein). CTGF plays important roles in various biological processes, including cell adhesion, migration, proliferation, angiogenesis, skeletal development, and tissue wound repair, and is critically involved in fibrotic disease and several forms of cancer.

== Structure and binding partners ==
Members of the CCN protein family, including CTGF, are structurally characterized by having four conserved, cysteine-rich domains. These domains are, from N- to C-termini, the insulin-like growth factor binding protein (IGFBP) domain, the von Willebrand type C repeats (vWC) domain, the thrombospondin type 1 repeat (TSR) domain, and a C-terminal domain (CT) with a cysteine knot motif. CTGF exerts its functions by binding to various cell surface receptors in a context-dependent manner, including integrin receptors, cell surface heparan sulfate proteoglycans (HSPGs), LRPs, and TrkA. In addition, CTGF also binds growth factors and extracellular matrix proteins. The N-terminal half of CTGF interacts with aggrecan, the TSR domain interacts with VEGF and, the CT domain interacts with members of the TGF-β superfamily, fibronectin, perlecan, fibulin-1, slit, and mucins.

== Role in development ==
Knockout mice with the Ctgf gene disrupted die at birth due to respiratory stress as a result of severe chondrodysplasia. Ctgf-null mice also show defects in angiogenesis, with impaired interaction between endothelial cells and pericytes and collagen IV deficiency in the endothelial basement membrane. CTGF is also important for pancreatic beta cell development and is critical for normal ovarian follicle development and ovulation.

== Clinical significance ==
CTGF is associated with wound healing and virtually all fibrotic pathology. It is thought that CTGF can cooperate with TGF-β to induce sustained fibrosis and to exacerbate extracellular matrix production in association with other fibrosis-inducing conditions. Overexpression of CTGF in fibroblasts promotes fibrosis in the dermis, kidney, and lung, and deletion of Ctgf in fibroblasts and smooth muscle cells greatly reduces bleomycin-induced skin fibrosis.

In addition to fibrosis, aberrant CTGF expression is also associated with many types of malignancies, diabetic nephropathy and retinopathy, arthritis, and cardiovascular diseases. Several clinical trials are now ongoing that investigate the therapeutic value of targeting CTGF in fibrosis, diabetic nephropathy, and pancreatic cancer.

CTGF (CCN2) has recently been implicated in mood disorders, notably in the postpartum period; these effects may be mediated by its effects on myelination

== See also ==
- CCN family member 1
- Ctgf/hcs24 CAESAR
