= Neointima =

Neointima typically refers to scar tissue that forms within tubular anatomical structures such as blood vessels, as the intima is the innermost lining of these structures. Neointima can form as a result of vascular surgery such as angioplasty or stent placement. Formation of neointima occurs due to proliferation of smooth muscle cells as well as macrophages.
