= Protein Wnt-5a =

Protein found in humans

WNT5A

Identifiers
- Aliases: WNT5A, hWnt family member 5A
- External IDs: OMIM: 164975; MGI: 98958; GeneCards: WNT5A

Gene location (Human)
Chr.	Chromosome 3 (human)
Band	3p14.3	Start	55,465,715 bp
Band	3p14.3	End	55,490,539 bp

Gene location (Mouse)
Chr.	Chromosome 14 (mouse)
Band	14 A3|14 16.8 cM	Start	28,226,707 bp
Band	14 A3|14 16.8 cM	End	28,249,405 bp
RNA expression pattern
Bgee	Human / Mouse (ortholog); Top expressed in: stromal cell of endometrium; parotid gland; decidua; oral cavity; germinal epithelium; gums; palpebral conjunctiva; gingival epithelium; urethra; periodontal fiber / Top expressed in: tail of embryo; Gonadal ridge; molar; stria vascularis; vas deferens; hand; utricle; transitional epithelium of urinary bladder; genital tubercle; tooth germ; More reference expression data
BioGPS	n/a
Gene ontology
Molecular function	protein domain specific binding; DNA-binding transcription factor activity; chemoattractant activity involved in axon guidance; receptor tyrosine kinase-like orphan receptor binding; signaling receptor binding; cytokine activity; frizzled binding; receptor ligand activity; protein binding; phospholipid binding
Cellular component	endocytic vesicle membrane; endoplasmic reticulum lumen; extracellular region; cell surface; extracellular exosome; plasma membrane; Golgi lumen; clathrin-coated endocytic vesicle membrane; extracellular space; clathrin-coated vesicle membrane; extracellular matrix; collagen-containing extracellular matrix; postsynapse; glutamatergic synapse
Biological process	somitogenesis; cellular response to retinoic acid; planar cell polarity pathway involved in outflow tract morphogenesis; excitatory synapse assembly; non-canonical Wnt signaling pathway; positive regulation of protein phosphorylation; negative chemotaxis; positive regulation of protein catabolic process; paraxial mesoderm formation; convergent extension involved in axis elongation; positive regulation of protein kinase C activity; cellular response to molecule of bacterial origin; positive regulation of protein localization to synapse; hindgut morphogenesis; positive regulation of JNK cascade; mesodermal to mesenchymal transition involved in gastrulation; regulation of protein localization; heart looping; protein phosphorylation; epithelial cell proliferation involved in mammary gland duct elongation; face development; establishment of epithelial cell apical/basal polarity; notochord morphogenesis; positive regulation of mesenchymal cell proliferation; mesenchymal-epithelial cell signaling; negative regulation of epithelial cell proliferation; planar cell polarity pathway involved in cardiac muscle tissue morphogenesis; cellular response to interferon-gamma; positive regulation of thymocyte apoptotic process; tube closure; positive regulation of non-canonical Wnt signaling pathway; type B pancreatic cell development; negative regulation of mesenchymal cell proliferation; primitive streak formation; cellular response to transforming growth factor beta stimulus; cellular response to calcium ion; dopaminergic neuron differentiation; positive regulation of type I interferon-mediated signaling pathway; cell fate commitment; negative regulation of fat cell differentiation; limb morphogenesis; convergent extension; lung development; positive regulation of fibroblast proliferation; optic cup formation involved in camera-type eye development; hematopoietic stem cell proliferation; embryonic digit morphogenesis; regulation of branching involved in mammary gland duct morphogenesis; negative regulation of axon extension involved in axon guidance; positive regulation of peptidyl-serine phosphorylation; chemorepulsion of dopaminergic neuron axon; positive regulation of transcription, DNA-templated; negative regulation of prostatic bud formation; planar cell polarity pathway involved in cardiac right atrium morphogenesis; positive regulation of endocytosis; morphogenesis of an epithelium; JNK cascade; cartilage development; positive regulation of GTPase activity; axis elongation; embryonic limb morphogenesis; positive regulation of cartilage development; neural tube development; pericardium morphogenesis; positive regulation of interleukin-6 production; post-anal tail morphogenesis; convergent extension involved in organogenesis; digestive tract morphogenesis; roof of mouth development; cell differentiation; neuron projection morphogenesis; male gonad development; positive regulation of inflammatory response; lateral sprouting involved in mammary gland duct morphogenesis; positive regulation of macrophage cytokine production; positive regulation of epithelial cell proliferation; urinary bladder development; planar cell polarity pathway involved in ventricular septum morphogenesis; positive regulation of JUN kinase activity; establishment of planar polarity; hypophysis morphogenesis; negative regulation of synapse assembly; wound healing; positive regulation of macrophage activation; negative regulation of apoptotic process; positive regulation of ossification; planar cell polarity pathway involved in axis elongation; negative regulation of melanin biosynthetic process; positive regulation of angiogenesis; embryonic skeletal system development; cervix development; uterus development; Wnt signaling pathway, planar cell polarity pathway; Wnt signaling pathway, calcium modulating pathway; positive regulation of NF-kappaB transcription factor activity; epithelial to mesenchymal transition; canonical Wnt signaling pathway; planar cell polarity pathway involved in pericardium morphogenesis; positive regulation of protein binding; negative regulation of transcription, DNA-templated; ameboidal-type cell migration; midbrain development; planar cell polarity pathway involved in gastrula mediolateral intercalation; positive regulation of protein kinase activity; positive regulation of cell-cell adhesion mediated by cadherin; neurogenesis; activation of protein kinase B activity; positive regulation of endothelial cell proliferation; axonogenesis; non-canonical Wnt signaling pathway via JNK cascade; activation of GTPase activity; positive regulation of cytokine production; vagina development; positive regulation of protein kinase C signaling; development of primary male sexual characteristics; mammary gland branching involved in thelarche; positive regulation of interferon-gamma production; somite development; keratinocyte differentiation; planar cell polarity pathway involved in neural tube closure; axon guidance; negative regulation of BMP signaling pathway; positive regulation of endothelial cell migration; genitalia development; negative regulation of fibroblast growth factor receptor signaling pathway; positive regulation of response to cytokine stimulus; multicellular organism development; inhibitory synapse assembly; neural tube closure; determination of left/right symmetry; lens development in camera-type eye; positive regulation of peptidyl-threonine phosphorylation; cochlea morphogenesis; inner ear morphogenesis; positive regulation of T cell chemotaxis; olfactory bulb interneuron development; positive regulation of cell population proliferation; positive regulation of neuron projection development; positive regulation of meiotic nuclear division; melanocyte proliferation; cellular response to lipopolysaccharide; cell migration; anterior/posterior axis specification, embryo; chemoattraction of serotonergic neuron axon; positive regulation of transcription by RNA polymerase II; anterior/posterior pattern specification; midgut development; planar cell polarity pathway involved in midbrain dopaminergic neuron differentiation; midbrain dopaminergic neuron differentiation; neuron differentiation; Wnt signaling pathway involved in midbrain dopaminergic neuron differentiation; negative regulation of cell proliferation in midbrain; negative regulation of canonical Wnt signaling pathway; planar cell polarity pathway involved in axon guidance; Wnt signaling pathway; response to organic substance; positive regulation of timing of anagen; membrane organization; positive regulation of canonical Wnt signaling pathway; presynapse assembly; postsynapse assembly; regulation of signaling receptor activity; positive regulation of gene expression; regulation of I-kappaB kinase/NF-kappaB signaling; positive regulation of G protein-coupled receptor signaling pathway; regulation of inflammatory response; regulation of synapse organization; secondary palate development; regulation of postsynapse organization; regulation of postsynaptic cytosolic calcium ion concentration; positive regulation of neuron projection arborization; positive regulation of neuron death
Sources:Amigo / QuickGO
Orthologs
Databases	NCBI: entry; OMA: entry
Species	Human	Mouse
Entrez	7474	22418
Ensembl	ENSG00000114251	ENSMUSG00000021994
UniProt	P41221	P22725
RefSeq (mRNA)	NM_001256105; NM_003392; NM_001377271; NM_001377272	NM_001256224; NM_009524
RefSeq (protein)	NP_001243034; NP_003383; NP_001364200; NP_001364201	NP_001243153; NP_033550
Location (UCSC)	Chr 3: 55.47 – 55.49 Mb	Chr 14: 28.23 – 28.25 Mb
PubMed search
- Wikidata
View/Edit Human	View/Edit Mouse

Protein Wnt-5a is a protein that in humans is encoded by the WNT5A gene.

== Function ==
The WNT gene family consists of structurally related genes that encode secreted signaling lipid modified glycoproteins. These proteins have been implicated in oncogenesis and in several developmental processes, including regulation of cell fate and patterning during embryogenesis. This gene is a member of the WNT gene family. The WNT5A is highly expressed in the dermal papilla of depilated skin. It encodes a protein showing 98%, 98%, and 87% amino acid identity to the mouse, rat and the xenopus Wnt5a protein, respectively. Wnts, specifically Wnt5a, have also been positively correlated and implicated in inflammatory diseases such as rheumatoid arthritis, tuberculosis, and atherosclerosis. A central player and active secretor of Wnt5a in both cancer and these inflammatory diseases are macrophages. Experiments performed in Xenopus laevis embryos have identified that human frizzled-5 (hFz5) is the receptor for the Wnt5a ligand and the Wnt5a/hFz5 signaling mediates axis induction. However, non-canonical Wnt5a has also been shown to bind to Ror1/2, RYK, and RTK depending on cell and receptor context to mediate a variety of functions ranging from cell proliferation, polarity, differentiation and apoptosis.

=== Development ===
WNT5A is a signaling molecule expressed embryonically during gastrulation in various developing body regions including the caudal mesoderm of the primitive streak, lateral mesoderm, cranial neural crest cells, midbrain, frontal face region, limb buds, mammary gland mesenchyme, caudal region, genital primordia and tailbud. Wnt5a-knockout mice (Wnt5a-/-) died shortly after birth and displayed a plethora of abnormalities, making loss of Wnt5a lethal. When compared to wild-type (WT) controls, Wnt5a-/- embryos developed shorter primitive streaks. Following primitive streak formation, during body axis patterning, Wnt5a-/- embryos also developed a shortened anterior-posterior (A-P) body axis in which the vertebral column was reduced in size due to smaller vertebrae and the lack of a proportion of caudal vertebrae. The resulting abnormalities found were fusion of vertebrae and ribs, and fusion and absence of thoracic, sacral, and tail vertebrae. Since Wnt5a is strongly expressed in the posterior portion of developing embryos, it is not surprising that the lower body were more greatly affected. The tail especially lacked vertebrae and was significantly shortened. As seen in the vertebral column, the nose, mandible, tongue and limbs were also shortened with loss of Wnt5a in both mice and chicks. Wnt5a is normally expressed at the distal end of limb buds and is involved with outgrowth and patterning of the limbs. With loss of Wnt5a, limb shortening is exaggerated as it continues towards the digits. Similar to the vertebral column, more distal structures were found fused and some absent

The Wnt5a gene is also a key component in posterior development of the female reproductive tract, development of the uterine glands postnatally, and the process of estrogen mediated cellular and molecular responses. Wnt5a is expressed throughout the endometrial stroma of the mammalian female reproductive tracts and is required in the development of the posterior formation of the Müllerian ducts (cervix, vagina). A Wnt5a absence study was performed by Mericskay et al. on mice and showed the anterior Müllerian-derived structures (oviducts and uterine horns) could easily be identified, and the posterior derived structures (cervix and vagina) were absent showing that this gene is a requirement for its development. Other members of the WNT family that are required for the development of the reproductive tract are Wnt4 and Wnt7a. Failure to develop reproductive tract will result in infertility. Not only is the WNT5A gene responsible for this formation but also is significate in the postnatal production of the uterine glands otherwise known as adenogenesis which is essential for adult function. In addition to these two developments Wnt5a it needed for the complete process of estrogen mediated cellular and molecular responses.

== Wnt ligands ==
Wnt ligands are classically described as acting in an autocrine/paracrine manner. Wnts are also hydrophobic with significant post-translational palmitoylation and glycosylation. These post-translational modifications are important for docking to extracellular lipoprotein particles allowing them to travel systemically. Additionally, due to the high degree of sequence homology between Wnts many are characterized by their downstream actions.

== Clinical significance ==
=== Cancer ===
Wnt5a is implicated in many different types of cancers. However, no consistent correlation occurs between cancer aggressiveness and Wnt5a signaling up-regulation or down-regulation. The WNT5A gene has been shown to encode two distinct isoforms, each with unique functions in the context of cancer. The two isoforms are termed Wnt5a-long (Wnt5a-L) and Wnt5a-short (Wnt5a-S) because Wnt5a-L is 18 amino acids longer than Wnt5a-S. These 18 amino acids appear to have contrasting roles in cancer. Specifically, Wnt5a-L inhibits proliferation and Wnt5a-S increases proliferation. This may account for the discrepancies as to the role of Wnt5a in various cancers; however, the significance of these two isoforms is not completely clear. Elevated levels of beta-catenin in both primary and metastases of melanoma have been correlated to improved survival and a decrease in cell markers of proliferation.

=== Cardiovascular Disease ===
Increasing evidence has implicated Wnt5a in chronic inflammatory disorders. In particular Wnt5a has been implicated in atherosclerosis. It has been previously reported that there is an association between Wnt5a mRNA and protein expression and histopathological severity of human atherosclerotic lesions as well as co-expression of Wnt5a and TLR4 in foam cells/macrophages of murine and human atherosclerotic lesions. However, the role of Wnt proteins in the process and development of inflammation in atherosclerosis and other inflammatory conditions is not yet clear.

=== Therapeutics ===
Some of the benefits of targeting this signaling pathway include:

• Many of the current DNA-targeting anticancer drugs carry the risk of giving rise to secondary tumors or additional primary cancers.

• Preferentially killing rapidly replicating malignant cells via cytotoxic agents cause serious side effects by injuring normal cells, particularly hematopoietic cells, intestinal cells, hair follicle and germ cells.

• Differentiated tumor cells in a state of quiescence are typically not affected by drugs can may account for tumor recurrence.
