= Cystine knot =

Protein structural motif

Cystine-knot domain
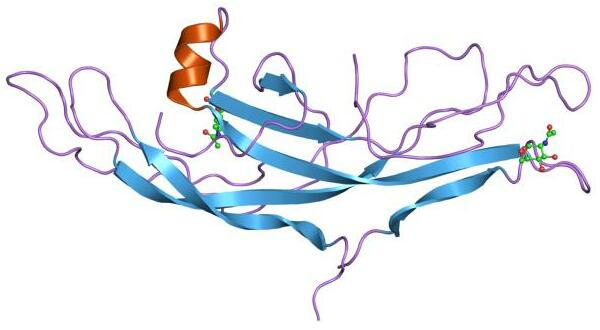
- Structure of human chorionic gonadotropin.

Identifiers
- Symbol: Cys_knot
- Pfam: PF00007
- Pfam clan: CL0079
- InterPro: IPR006208
- SCOP2: 1hcn / SCOPe / SUPFAM
Available protein structures:
- PDB: 1fl7, 1hcn, 1hrp, 1qfw, 1xwd IPR006208 PF00007 (ECOD; PDBsum)
- AlphaFold: IPR006208; PF00007

A cystine knot is a protein structural motif containing three disulfide bridges (formed from pairs of cysteine residues). The sections of polypeptide that occur between two of them form a loop through which a third disulfide bond passes, forming a rotaxane-like substructure. The cystine knot motif stabilizes protein structure and is conserved in proteins across various species. There are three types of cystine knot, which differ in the topology of the disulfide bonds:

- Growth factor cystine knot (GFCK)
- Inhibitor cystine knot (ICK), common in spider and snail toxins
- Cyclic cystine knot, or cyclotide

The growth factor cystine knot was first observed in the structure of nerve growth factor (NGF), solved by X-ray crystallography and published in 1991. The GFCK is present in four superfamilies. These include nerve growth factor, transforming growth factor beta (TGF-β), platelet-derived growth factor, and glycoprotein hormones including human chorionic gonadotropin. These are structurally related due to the presence of the cystine knot motif but differ in sequence. All GFCK structures that have been determined are dimeric, but their dimerization modes in different classes are different. The vascular endothelial growth factor subfamily, categorized as part of the platelet-derived growth factor superfamily, includes proteins that are angiogenic factors.

The presence of the cyclic cystine knot (CCK) motif was discovered when cyclotides were isolated from various plant families. The CCK motif has a cyclic backbone, triple stranded beta sheet, and cystine knot conformation.

Inhibitor cystine knot (ICK) is a structural motif with a triple stranded antiparallel beta sheet linked by three disulfide bonds, forming a knotted core. It is often found in many venom peptides such as those of snails, spiders, and scorpions. Peptide K-PVIIA, which contains an ICK, can undergo a successful enzymatic backbone cyclization. The disulfide connectivity and the common sequence pattern of the ICK motif provides the stability of the peptides that support cyclization.

== Drug implications ==
The stability and structure of the cystine knot motif implicates possible applications in drug design. The disulfide bonds and the hydrogen bonding between the beta-sheet regions make the structure highly stable, and it has a fairly small size (around 30 amino acids). These two characteristics make it an attractive biomolecule to be used for drug delivery as it exhibits thermal stability, chemical stability, and proteolytic resistance. Studies have shown that cystine knot proteins can be incubated at temperatures of 65 °C or placed in 1N HCl/1N NaOH without loss of structural and functional integrity. Together with a partial resistance to proteases, these properties make cystine knot peptides attractive platforms for orally-dosed pharmaceuticals.
