= Matricellular protein =

A matricellular protein is a dynamically expressed non-structural protein that is present in the extracellular matrix (ECM). Rather than serving as stable structural elements in the ECM, these proteins are rapidly turned over and have regulatory roles. They characteristically contain binding sites for ECM structural proteins and cell surface receptors, and may sequester and modulate activities of specific growth factors.

Examples of matricellular proteins include the CCN family of proteins (also known as CCN intercellular signaling protein), fibulins, osteopontin, periostin, SPARC family members, tenascin(s), and thrombospondins. Many of these proteins have important functions in wound healing and tissue repair.

== See also ==
- CCN protein
