= MiR-203 =

miR-203
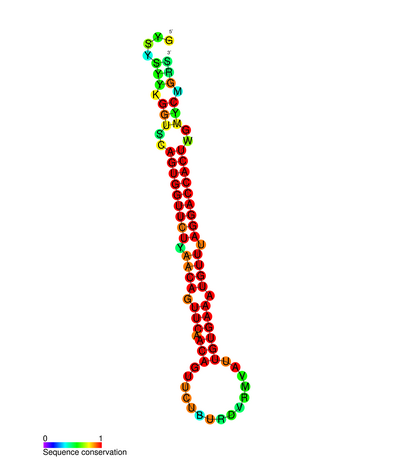
- miR-203 microRNA secondary structure and sequence conservation

Identifiers
- Symbol: mir-203
- Rfam: RF00696
- miRBase family: MIPF0000108
- NCBI Gene: 406986
- HGNC: 31581
- OMIM: 611899

Other data
- RNA type: microRNA
- Domain(s): Eukaryota; Euteleostomi
- PDB structures: PDBe

In molecular biology miR-203 is a short non-coding RNA molecule. MicroRNAs function to regulate the expression levels of other genes by several mechanisms, such as translational repression and Argonaute-catalyzed messenger RNA cleavage. miR-203 has been identified as a skin-specific microRNA, and it forms an expression gradient that defines the boundary between proliferative epidermal basal progenitors and terminally differentiating suprabasal cells. It has also been found upregulated in psoriasis and differentially expressed in some types of cancer.

== Introduction ==
MicroRNAs are short (20-22nt), non-coding RNA molecules involved in the regulation of messenger RNAs (mRNAs) by pairing with their 3' UTR and affecting their stability or directing their silencing or degradation. MicroRNAs are likely to play roles in most cellular processes, including proliferation, development, differentiation and apoptosis. They are located in intergenic and intragenic regions, and are transcribed as pri-miRNA by RNA polymerase II or RNA polymerase III. They then undergo extensive post-transcriptional modifications, starting with the processing of the pri-miRNA in the nucleus to generate a 70-100 nt long pre-miRNA by ribonucleases Drosha and DGCR8. This pre-miRNA is then transported out of the nucleus by Exportin-5, and is then further processed by Dicer into a mature 18-25 nt long double stranded microRNA. The guide strand of the miRNA is then loaded into RNA-induced silencing complex (RISC) and is then able to pair with its target. The passenger strand, denoted by a star, is commonly degraded, though this is not always the case.

MiR-203 is a microRNA that is specifically expressed in keratinocytes (the most abundant cell type in the epidermis) and in normal conditions promotes epidermal differentiation by restricting proliferative potential and inducing cell-cycle exit. It does so by repressing p63, an essential regulator of stem cell maintenance in epithelial stratified tissues. Other proposed targets are suppressor of cytokine signaling 3 (SOCS3) and ABL1.

As is the case with many other microRNAs, miR-203 expression has been found dysregulated in several malignancies, including psoriasis, rheumatoid arthritis and carcinogenesis.

== Localization ==
In mice, miR-203 is located in chromosome 12, within a fragile 7-Mb region that is lost is some hematopoietic malignancies. This region encodes 52 mature miRNAs, ~12% of the mammalian miRNA genome. In humans, this region is conserved and located intergenically in 14q32.

== Tissue specificity ==
Sonkoly et al. found that miR-203 displays a highly organ- and tissue-specific expression across 21 human organs and tissues analyzed. miR-203 was expressed at highest level in skin and in the esophagus, an organ sharing anatomical similarities with skin. Yi et al. performed whole-mouse embryo in situ hybridization detecting miR-203-specific signal from the epidermis and the tongue. Skin-specific expression of miR-203 has been observed in zebrafish indicating that not only the sequence but the tissue specificity of miR-203 is preserved through evolution. Since these findings, the number of studies identified decreased miR-203 expression in various malignancies, mainly of epithelial origin.

== Regulation ==
=== Regulation during differentiation ===
Sonkoly et al. demonstrated that expression of endogenous miR-203 expression is under the control of protein kinase C pathway in epithelial cells. They demonstrated that c-jun suppresses, while another member of the AP-1 transcription factor complex, JUNB increases miR-203 expression. Growth factors, such as Epidermal growth factor can also suppress miR-203 in epithelial cells...

=== Regulation in tumors ===
Multiple mechanisms can suppress miR-203 expression in malignancies: Wellner et al. show that ZEB1 represses expression of miR-203 together with the miR-200-family whose members are strong inducers of epithelial differentiation. They propose that ZEB1 links EMT-activation and stemness-maintenance by suppressing stemness-inhibiting microRNAs (miRNAs) and thereby is a promoter of mobile, migrating cancer stem cells.

Sonkoly et al. demonstrated that activation of the Hedgehog signaling pathway, can lead to decreased miR-203 expression in mouse model of basal cell carcinoma. They demonstrate that overexpression of c-jun, a potent proto-oncogene commonly deregulated in a wide range of cancers suppresses miR-203 expression. Overexpression of c-JUN has been described in basal cell carcinoma in which miR-203 is one of the most downregulated microRNA.

McKenna et al. demonstrated that miR-203 expression in keratinocytes is dependent on regulation of p53 levels by E6, which may explain how expression of HPV16 E6 can disrupt the balance between proliferation and differentiation, as well as the response to DNA damage, in keratinocytes.

== Evidence ==
This microRNA was predicted using computational tools by comparison to mouse and tiger blowfish sequences. It has been validated in zebrafish and its expression confirmed in humans by cloning and sequencing, where it was found in the outer layer of epidermis.

== Targets ==
miR-203 has several validated targets. p63, conserved across vertebrate lineages. p63 is an essential regulator of stem cell maintenance in stratified epithelial tissues. Yi et al. confirmed p63 as a target of miR-203. They showed that miR-203 expression is conspicuous in terminally differentiating epithelial cells, but is not present on their proliferative progenitor compartments, and shows a mutually exclusive pattern of expression with p63. They also report downregulation of proteins downstream of p63, suggesting a mechanistic method for inhibition of proliferative potential of epidermal stem cells.

There is some controversy as to whether suppressor of cytokine signaling 3 (SOCS3) is also targeted by miR-203. In their study, Lena et al. (2008) showed that, despite bioinformatic alignment of miR-203 with SOCS3 3'UTR, the levels of SOCS3 transcripts increased in keratinocytes stimulated to differentiate in vitro, in parallel with miR-203. Then they exogenously expressed miR-203 in mouse keratinocytes and showed that SOCS3 is not repressed by miR-203.

In contrast, Wei et al. (2010) validated SOCS3 as a target for miR-203. In their study, they introduced the SOCS3 3'UTR fragment encompassing the putative target site in a luciferase reporter vector, and they observed a significant decrease in luciferase activity when miR-203 was introduced compared to controls. They also generated a mutation in the binding site and reported restoration of luciferase activity, as well as mutually exclusive localization with miR-203. They concluded that SOCS3 is targeted by miR-203, and hypothesize that miR-203 regulation of SOCS3 and thus of STAT3 could have implications in keratinocyte functions.

Another validated target of miR-203 is c-jun (AP-1), a potent proto-oncogene commonly deregulated in a wide range of cancers, including skin tumors. The suppression of miR-203 in BCC tumors was associated with a marked increase of c-JUN expression, evidenced by the intense and uniform distribution in BCC tumor nests. Similar to other miR-203 targets previously identified, such as p63, c-JUN was preferentially expressed in the basal, proliferative layer of healthy human epidermis.

Another putative target is ABL1, which is found activated in hematopoietic malignancies where miR-203 is epigenetically silenced by hypermethylation.

In lung cancer cell lines, miR-203 has been shown to target DKK1, a secreted protein which acts as a survival factor in certain conditions. Its survival activity is only conditional because it requires the presence of its transmembrane receptor protein KRM1. KRM1 is a Dependence Receptor and signals for cell death until such signalling is blocked by binding of its survival factor ligand DKK1. miR-203 mediated downregulation of DKK1 appears to make lung cancer cells easier to kill, suggesting that cancer cells upregulate DKK1 for their own survival and this protein would be a good target for downregulation in the treatment of such cancers. DKK1 is also a well known inhibitor of Wnt signalling and is required for the formation of head structures during embryonic development of most animals.

== Foetal skin development ==
Yi et al. showed that in mice, the expression of miR-203 is significantly upregulated between E13.5 and E15.5, suggesting that it may be absent from multipotent progenitors of single-layered epidermis, but is induced upon stratification and differentiation. It also was expressed at high levels in differentiating cells such as hair follicles, epidermis and sebaceous glands.

Wei et al. demonstrated that in humans, miR-203 expression is first detectable at 17 weeks gestation in the suprabasal layers of epidermis, and this localization was conserved in the adult skin. When miR-203 is expressed prematurely, basal cells diminish their proliferative potential; and when it is absent, proliferation is no longer restricted to the basal layer of epidermis.

== Role in carcinogenesis ==
miR-203 has been found overexpressed in pancreatic adenocarcinoma and shows correlation with poor prognosis in patients that had undergone pancreatectomy, and has been suggested as a new prognostic marker for this disease. Also, miR-203 has been identified as target of human papillomavirus (HPV) protein E7, which causes its downregulation and thus de-repression of p63 and its downstream targets, ensuring proliferative potential on the host cell, required for the virus to replicate. High levels of miR-203 are inhibitory of HPV amplification.

miR-203 has also been proposed as a tumor-suppressive microRNA in hepatocellular carcinoma (HCC) and hematopoietic malignancies. In their study, Furuta et al. found miR-203, along with miR-124, epigenetically silenced in primary HCC tumors compared with non-tumorous liver tissues. Also, expression of miR-203 in HCC cells lacking their expression inhibited cell growth and downregulated a set of other possible targets. Bueno et al. also found silencing of miR-203 in some leukemias, as well as an inverse correlation between miR-203 and ABL1 levels (sometimes expressed as the BCR-ABL1 fusion protein). Supporting its role as a tumor suppressor, it has also been found upregulated upon UVC irradiation in the squamous cell carcinoma lines, suggesting a connection between miR-203 and the activation of the apoptotic program.

miR-203 acts as a tumor suppressor in basal cell carcinoma (BCC) in which it forms a double-negative feedback-loop with its verified target c-JUN (AP1). This regulatory circuit provides functional control over basal cell proliferation and differentiation. Its expression was suppressed in K5TreGli1 trangenic mice, due to activated Hedgehog signaling. Further supporting the role of miR-203 as a tumor suppressor, in vivo delivery of miR-203 mimics in a BCC mouse model results in the reduction of tumor growth.

== Role in psoriasis and rheumatoid arthritis ==
Sonkoly et al. identified miR-203, along with miR-146a, miR-21, and miR-125b; as a psoriasis-specific microRNA when compared with healthy human skin or atopic eczema. They also observed downregulation of SOCS3 concurrently with upregulation of miR-203 in psoriatic plaques, potentially having an effect in inflammatory responses.

Stanczyk et al. found overexpression of miR-203 in rheumatoid arthritis synovial fibroblasts (RASFs) compared to healthy or osteoarthritis samples; and inforced expression of miR-203 led to higher levels of MMP-1 and IL-6 and thus contributed to the activated phenotype of RASFs. MiR-203 regulation was found to be methylation-dependent.
