= Dickkopf =

Family of proteins

Dickkopf-related protein 1

Identifiers
- Symbol: DKK1
- NCBI gene: 22943
- HGNC: 2891
- OMIM: 605189
- RefSeq: NP_036374
- UniProt: O94907

Other data
- Locus: Chr. 10 q21.1
Search for
- Structures: Swiss-model
- Domains: InterPro

Dickkopf-related protein 2

Identifiers
- Symbol: DKK2
- NCBI gene: 27123
- HGNC: 2892
- OMIM: 605415
- RefSeq: NP_055236
- UniProt: Q9UBU2

Other data
- Locus: Chr. 4 q25
Search for
- Structures: Swiss-model
- Domains: InterPro

Dickkopf-related protein 3

Identifiers
- Symbol: DKK3
- NCBI gene: 27122
- HGNC: 2893
- OMIM: 605416
- RefSeq: NP_037385
- UniProt: Q9QUN9

Other data
- Locus: Chr. 11 p15.3
Search for
- Structures: Swiss-model
- Domains: InterPro

Dickkopf-related protein 4

Identifiers
- Symbol: DKK4
- NCBI gene: 27121
- HGNC: 2894
- OMIM: 605417
- RefSeq: NP_055235
- UniProt: Q9UBT3

Other data
- Locus: Chr. 8 p11.21
Search for
- Structures: Swiss-model
- Domains: InterPro

Dickkopf (DKK) is a family of proteins consisting of five members as of 2020. That is, vertebrates usually contain five genes that are members of the family. The most well-studied is Dickkopf-related protein 1 (DKK1). DKK proteins inhibit the Wnt signaling pathway coreceptors LRP5 and LRP6. They bind with high affinity as ligands to KREMEN1 and KREMEN2, which are transmembrane proteins. DKK proteins have important roles in the development of vertebrates.

== Etymology ==
Dickkopf is a German word meaning "stubborn person", or literally, "thick head". It was coined as the name for these proteins in a 1998 Nature paper by Glinka et al. in reference to the discovery that DKK1 induces head formation in the embryogenesis of Xenopus.

== Structure ==
DKK proteins are glycoproteins consisting of 255–350 amino acids. DKK1, DKK2, and DKK4 have similar molecular weights, at 24–29 kDa (kilodaltons). DKK3 is heaviest, at 38 kDa. In addition to having similar weights, DKK1, -2, and -4 have high structural similarity, with two shared cysteine-rich domains. DKK3 differs from -1, -2, and -4 by the presence of a Soggy domain at its N-terminus.

== Proteins ==
Four DKK proteins and one DKK-like protein occur in humans and other vertebrates, with five proteins in the family in total:

- DKK1
- DKK2
- DKK3
- DKK4
- DKKL1 (soggy-1, Cancer/testis antigen 34)

== Human disease ==
DKK proteins are believed to be involved with several human diseases, including bone cancer and neurodegenerative disease. Evidence also indicates DKK1 and DKK3 are involved in the pathophysiology of the artery, where they could contribute to atherosclerosis.
