= DKK2 =

Protein-coding gene in the species Homo sapiens

Identifiers
- Aliases: DKK2, DKK-2, dickkopf WNT signaling pathway inhibitor 2
- External IDs: OMIM: 605415; MGI: 1890663; GeneCards: DKK2
Available structures
PDB	Ortholog search: PDBe RCSB
PDB	List of PDB id codes 2JTK

Gene location (Human)
Chr.	Chromosome 4 (human)
Band	4q25	Start	106,921,802 bp
Band	4q25	End	107,283,806 bp

Gene location (Mouse)
Chr.	Chromosome 3 (mouse)
Band	3|3 G3	Start	131,791,053 bp
Band	3|3 G3	End	131,886,065 bp
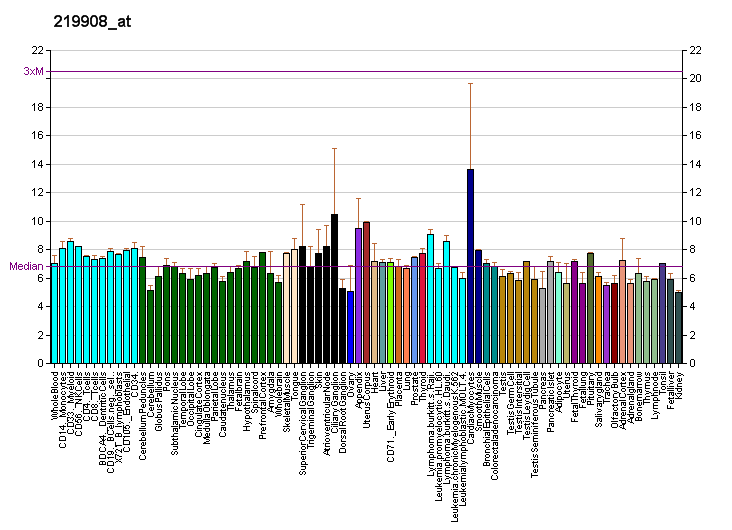
RNA expression pattern
Bgee	Human / Mouse (ortholog); Top expressed in: skin of thigh; skin of hip; buccal mucosa cell; Achilles tendon; testicle; Skeletal muscle tissue of rectus abdominis; hair follicle; thoracic diaphragm; right lung; muscle of thigh / Top expressed in: vestibular membrane of cochlear duct; external carotid artery; internal carotid artery; iris; glomerulus; umbilical cord; conjunctival fornix; saccule; gastrula; glomerular mesangium; More reference expression data
BioGPS	More reference expression data
Gene ontology
Molecular function	co-receptor binding; receptor antagonist activity
Cellular component	extracellular region; extracellular space
Biological process	positive regulation of canonical Wnt signaling pathway; multicellular organism development; negative regulation of Wnt signaling pathway; Wnt signaling pathway; negative regulation of canonical Wnt signaling pathway; extracellular negative regulation of signal transduction; negative regulation of signaling receptor activity
Sources:Amigo / QuickGO
Orthologs
Databases	NCBI: entry; OMA: entry
Species	Human	Mouse
Entrez	27123	56811
Ensembl	ENSG00000155011	ENSMUSG00000028031
UniProt	Q9UBU2	Q9QYZ8
RefSeq (mRNA)	NM_014421	NM_020265
RefSeq (protein)	NP_055236	NP_064661
Location (UCSC)	Chr 4: 106.92 – 107.28 Mb	Chr 3: 131.79 – 131.89 Mb
PubMed search
- Wikidata
View/Edit Human	View/Edit Mouse

Dickkopf-related protein 2 is a protein in the Dickkopf family that in humans is encoded by the DKK2 gene.

This gene encodes a protein that is a member of the dickkopf family. The secreted protein contains two cysteine rich regions and is involved in embryonic development through its interactions with the Wnt signaling pathway.

It can act as either an agonist or antagonist of Wnt/beta-catenin signaling, depending on the cellular context and the presence of the co-factor kremen 2. Activity of this protein is also modulated by binding to the Wnt co-receptor LDL-receptor related protein 6 (LRP6).

== See also ==
- Hairy palms and soles
