= OPPG =

OPPG may refer to:

- Panjgur Airport (ICAO: OPPG), Balochistan, Pakistan
- Office of Public & Professional Guardians, housed within the Florida Department of Elder Affairs
- Operation Pedro Pan Group, Inc., a non-profit charitable organization founded in 1991 by the former children of Pedro Pan
- Opponents Points per game, in sports statistics
- Osteoporosis-pseudoglioma syndrome, a medical condition
