= VEK-30 protein domain =

VEK-30
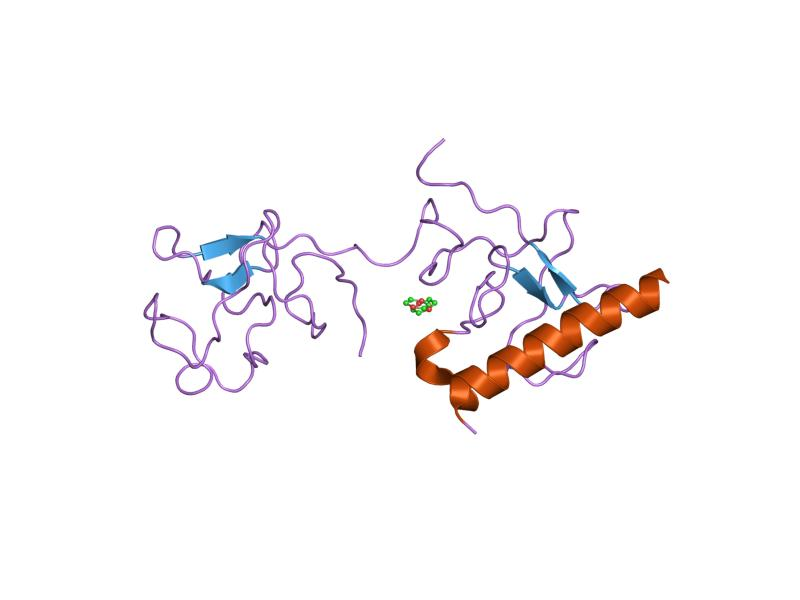
- the x-ray crystallographic structure of the angiogenesis inhibitor, angiostatin, bound a to a peptide from the group a streptococcal surface protein pam

Identifiers
- Symbol: VEK-30
- Pfam: PF12107
- InterPro: IPR021965
Available protein structures:
- Pfam: structures / ECOD
- PDB: RCSB PDB; PDBe; PDBj
- PDBsum: structure summary

In molecular biology, the protein domain VEK-30, is a 30-amino acid long, internal peptide present within bacterial organisms that acts as an epitope or antigenic determinant. It increases the pathogenicity of the cell. More specifically, it is found in streptococcal M-like plasminogen (Pg)-binding protein (PAM) from gram-positive group-A streptococci (GAS). VEK-30 represents an epitope within PAM that shows high affinity for the lysine binding site (LBS) of the kringle-2 (K2) domain of human (h)Pg.

== Plasminogen ==
Plasminogen (Pg) is an important mediator of angiostatin production in the fibrinolytic pathway. Plasminogen is made up of five subunit kringle molecules (Pg-K1 to Pg-K5), of which the first three make the protein angiostatin. VEK-30 is a protein domain of the group A streptococcal protein PAM. It binds to Pg-K2 domain of angiostatin and activates the molecule to mediate its anti-angiogenic effects. VEK-30 binds to angiostatin via a C-terminal lysine with argininyl and glutamyl side chain residues known as a 'through space isostere'.

== Function ==
Since VEK-30 binds to Pg-K2 domain of angiostatin, its function is crucial to blood clotting, and in lower organisms increase their pathogenicity.

== Structure ==
In solution, it has been found that VEK-30, exhibited the canonical fold of a kringle domain, including a lack of regular secondary structure.
