= Worth syndrome =

- Worth syndrome has an autosomal dominant pattern of inheritance.

Worth syndrome, also known as benign form of Worth hyperostosis corticalis generalisata with torus platinus, autosomal dominant osteosclerosis, autosomal dominant endosteal hyperostosis or Worth disease, is a rare autosomal dominant congenital disorder that is caused by a mutation in the LRP5 gene. It is characterized by increased bone density and benign bony structures on the palate.

== Causes ==
Worth syndrome is caused by a mutation in the LRP5 gene, located on human chromosome 11q13.4. The disorder is inherited in an autosomal dominant fashion. This indicates that the defective gene responsible for a disorder is located on an autosome (chromosome 11 is an autosome), and only one copy of the defective gene is sufficient to cause the disorder, when inherited from a parent who has the disorder.

== Diagnosis ==
Diagnosis of Worth syndrome can be performed by dual-energy X-ray absorptiometry (DEXA) scan, which measures bone density using X-rays, along with measurement of serum alkaline phosphatase to rule out Van Buchem's disease. Confirmation of LRP5 mutation can be done via genetic testing.

== History ==
The condition was first reported by H. M. Worth in 1966. In 1977, two doctors, R.J. Gorlin and L. Glass, distinguished the syndrome from van Buchem disease. In 1987 a group of Spanish doctors pointed out that the condition may not be benign, and may sometimes cause nerve damage.
