= KREMEN1 =

Protein-coding gene in the species Homo sapiens

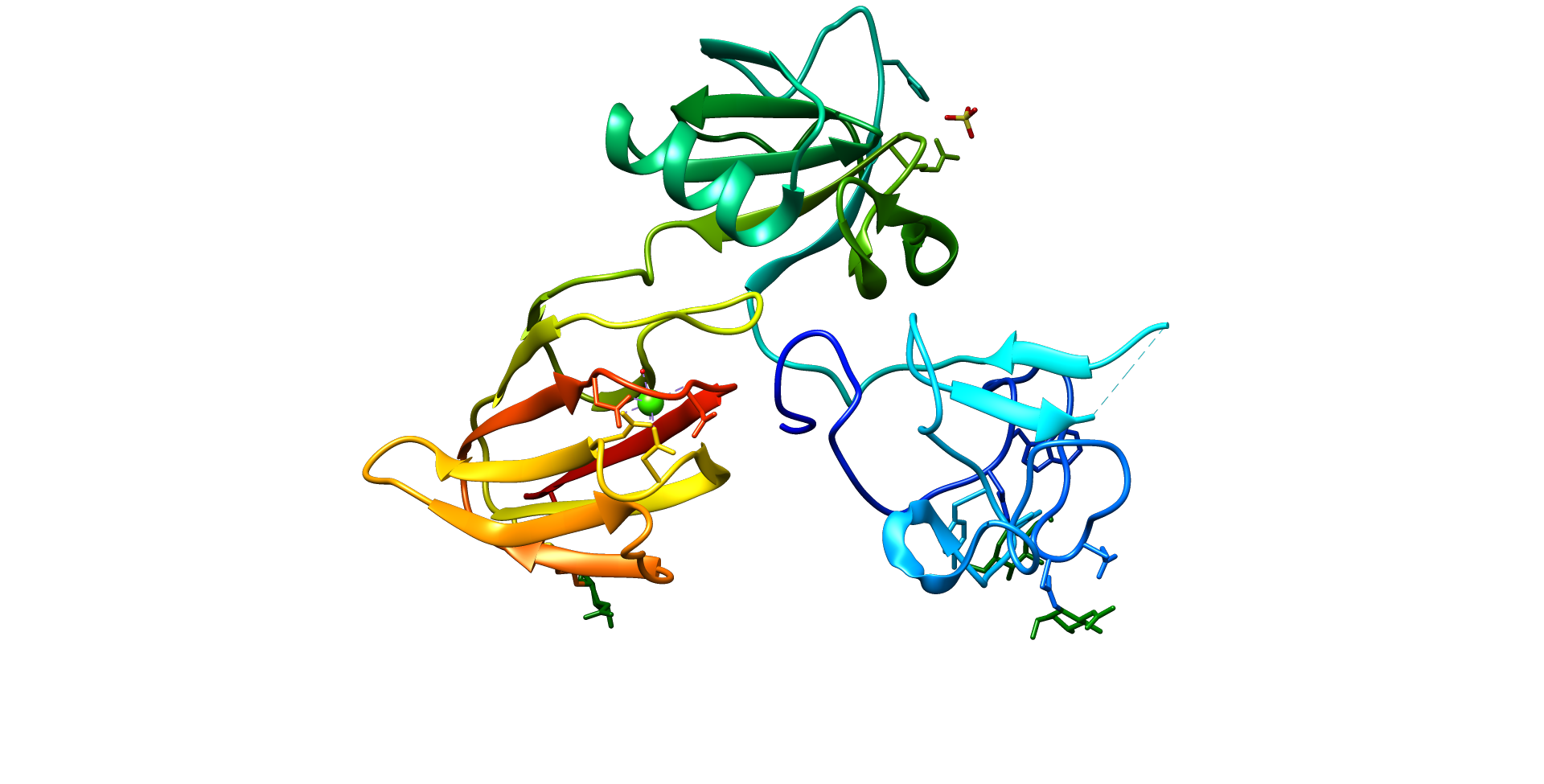

Identifiers
- Aliases: KREMEN1, KREMEN, KRM1, kringle containing transmembrane protein 1, ECTD13
- External IDs: OMIM: 609898; MGI: 1933988; GeneCards: KREMEN1
Available structures
PDB	Ortholog search: PDBe RCSB
PDB	List of PDB id codes 5FWS, 5FWT, 5FWV

Gene location (Human)
Chr.	Chromosome 22 (human)
Band	22q12.1	Start	29,073,035 bp
Band	22q12.1	End	29,168,333 bp

Gene location (Mouse)
Chr.	Chromosome 11 (mouse)
Band	11|11 A1	Start	5,141,552 bp
Band	11|11 A1	End	5,211,558 bp
RNA expression pattern
Bgee	Human / Mouse (ortholog); Top expressed in: skin of arm; decidua; parotid gland; cardiac muscle tissue of right atrium; vena cava; tibialis anterior muscle; myocardium of left ventricle; gingival epithelium; Skeletal muscle tissue of rectus abdominis; body of tongue / Top expressed in: interventricular septum; lip; muscle layer of urethra; thymus; vestibular membrane of cochlear duct; muscle of thigh; soleus muscle; ascending aorta; aortic valve; esophagus; More reference expression data
BioGPS	n/a
Gene ontology
Molecular function	protein binding
Cellular component	integral component of membrane; membrane; plasma membrane; soma
Biological process	regulation of canonical Wnt signaling pathway; cell communication; Wnt signaling pathway; apoptotic process; negative regulation of ossification; limb development; negative regulation of canonical Wnt signaling pathway; negative regulation of axon regeneration
Sources:Amigo / QuickGO
Orthologs
Databases	NCBI: entry; OMA: entry
Species	Human	Mouse
Entrez	83999	84035
Ensembl	ENSG00000183762	ENSMUSG00000020393
UniProt	Q96MU8	Q99N43
RefSeq (mRNA)	NM_001039570; NM_032045; NM_153379	NM_032396
RefSeq (protein)	NP_001034659; NP_114434	NP_115772
Location (UCSC)	Chr 22: 29.07 – 29.17 Mb	Chr 11: 5.14 – 5.21 Mb
PubMed search
- Wikidata
View/Edit Human	View/Edit Mouse

Kremen protein 1 is a protein that in humans is encoded by the KREMEN1 gene. Kremen1 is conserved in chordates including amphioxus and most vertebrate species. The protein is a type I transmembrane receptor of ligands Dickkopf1, Dickkopf2, Dickkopf3, Dickkopf4, EpCAM and R-spondin 1.

== Function ==
This gene encodes a high-affinity dickkopf homolog 1 (DKK1) transmembrane receptor that functionally cooperates with DKK1 to block wingless (WNT)/beta-catenin signaling. The encoded protein is a component of a membrane complex that modulates canonical WNT signaling through lipoprotein receptor-related protein 6 (LRP6). It contains extracellular Kringle, WSC, and CUB domains. Alternatively spliced transcript variants encoding distinct isoforms have been observed for this gene.

Kremen1 also has a function in the induction of cell death by apoptosis. This proapoptotic activity is conditional and depends on the absence of ligand Dickkopf1. These observations led to the classification of this protein as a Dependence Receptor.

A mouse knock out of Kremen1 and its paralog Kremen2 is viable and fertile.
