= Dependence receptor =

Proteins that mediate programmed cell death

In cellular biology, dependence receptors are proteins that mediate programmed cell death by monitoring the absence of certain trophic factors (or, equivalently, the presence of anti-trophic factors) that otherwise serve as ligands (interactors) for the dependence receptors. A trophic ligand is a molecule whose protein binding stimulates cell growth, differentiation, and/or survival. Cells depend for their survival on stimulation that is mediated by various receptors and sensors, and integrated via signaling within the cell and between cells. The withdrawal of such trophic support leads to a form of cellular suicide.

Various dependence receptors are involved in a range of biological events: developmental cell death (naturally occurring cell death), trophic factor withdrawal-induced cell death, the spontaneous regression characteristic of type IV-S neuroblastoma, neurodegenerative cell death, inhibition of new tumor cells (tumorigenesis) and metastasis, and therapeutic antibody-mediated tumor cell death, as well as programmed cell death in other instances. Since these receptors may support either cell death or cell survival, they initiate a new type of tumor suppressor, a conditional tumor suppressor. In addition, events such as cellular atrophy and process retraction may also be mediated by dependence receptors, although this has not been as well documented as the induction of programmed cell death.

== Receptors ==
The following is the list of known dependence receptors:

- Notch3
- Kremen1
- DCC (Deleted in Colorectal Carcinoma)
- UNC5 receptors (UNC5A, UNC5B, UNC5C, UNC5D)
- Neogenin
- p75NTR
- Ptch1
- CDON
- PLXND1
- RET
- TrkA
- TrkC
- EphA4
- c-Met
- Insulin receptor IR
- Insulin-like growth factor 1 receptor
- ALK (anaplastic lymphoma kinase)
- Androgen receptor
- Some integrins
- NTRK3

== Background ==
Cells depend for their survival on stimulation that is mediated by various receptors and sensors. For any required stimulus, its withdrawal leads to a form of cellular suicide; that is, the cell plays an active role in its own demise. The term programmed cell death was first suggested by Lockshin & Williams in 1964. Apoptosis, a form of programmed cell death, was first described by Kerr et al. in 1972, although the earliest references to the morphological appearance of such cells may date back to the late 19th century.

Cells require different stimuli for survival, depending on their type and state of differentiation. For example, prostate epithelial cells require testosterone for survival, and the withdrawal of testosterone leads to apoptosis in these cells. How do cells recognize a lack of stimulus? While positive survival signals are clearly important, a complementary form of signal transduction is pro-apoptotic, and is activated or propagated by stimulus withdrawal or by the addition of an "anti-trophin."

The dependence receptor notion was based on the observation that the effects of a number of receptors that function in both nervous system development and the production of tumors (especially metastasis) cannot be explained simply by a positive effect of signal transduction induced by ligand binding, but rather must also include cell death signaling in response to trophic withdrawal.

Positive survival signals involve classical signal transduction, initiated by interactions between ligands and receptors. Negative survival signals involve an alternative form of signal transduction that is initiated by the withdrawal of ligands from dependence receptors. This process is seen in developmental cell death, carcinogenesis (especially metastasis), neurodegeneration, and possibly non-lethal (sub-apoptotic) events such as neurite retraction and somal atrophy. Mechanistic studies of dependence receptors suggest that these receptors form complexes that activate and amplify caspase activity. In at least some cases, the caspase activation is via a pathway that is dependent on caspase-9 but not on mitochondria. Some of the downstream mediators have been identified, such as DAP kinase and the DRAL gene.

Dependence receptors display the common property that they mediate two different intracellular signals: in the presence of ligand, these receptors transduce a positive signal leading to survival, differentiation or migration; conversely, in the absence of ligand, the receptors initiate and/or amplify a signal for programmed cell death. Thus cells that express these proteins at sufficient concentrations manifest a state of dependence on their respective ligands. The signaling that mediates cell death induction upon ligand withdrawal is incompletely defined, but typically includes a required interaction with, and cleavage by, specific caspases. Mutation of the caspase site(s) in the receptor, of which there is typically one or two, prevents the trophic ligand withdrawal-induced programmed cell death.

Complex formation appears to be a function of ligand-receptor interaction, and dependence receptors appear to exist in at least two conformational states. Complex formation in the absence of ligand leads to caspase activation by a mechanism that is usually dependent on caspase cleavage of the receptor itself, releasing pro-apoptotic peptides. Thus these receptors may serve in caspase amplification, and in so doing create cellular states of dependence on their respective ligands. These states of dependence are not absolute, since they can be blocked downstream in some cases by the expression of anti-apoptotic genes such as Bcl-2 or P35. However, they result in a shift toward an increased likelihood of a cell's undergoing apoptosis.

== Research ==
Research has highlighted the role of the dependence receptor UNC5D in the phenomenon of spontaneous regression of type IV-S neuroblastoma. TrkA and TrkC have been shown to function as dependence receptors, with TrkC mediating both neural cell death and tumorigenesis. In addition, although dependence receptors have been described as mediating programmed cell death in the absence of binding of trophic ligand, the possibility that a similar effect might be achieved by the binding of a physiological anti-trophin has been raised, and it has been suggested that the Alzheimer's disease-associated peptide, Aβ, may play such a role.
