= Sclerostin =

Protein-coding gene in the species Homo sapiens

SOST
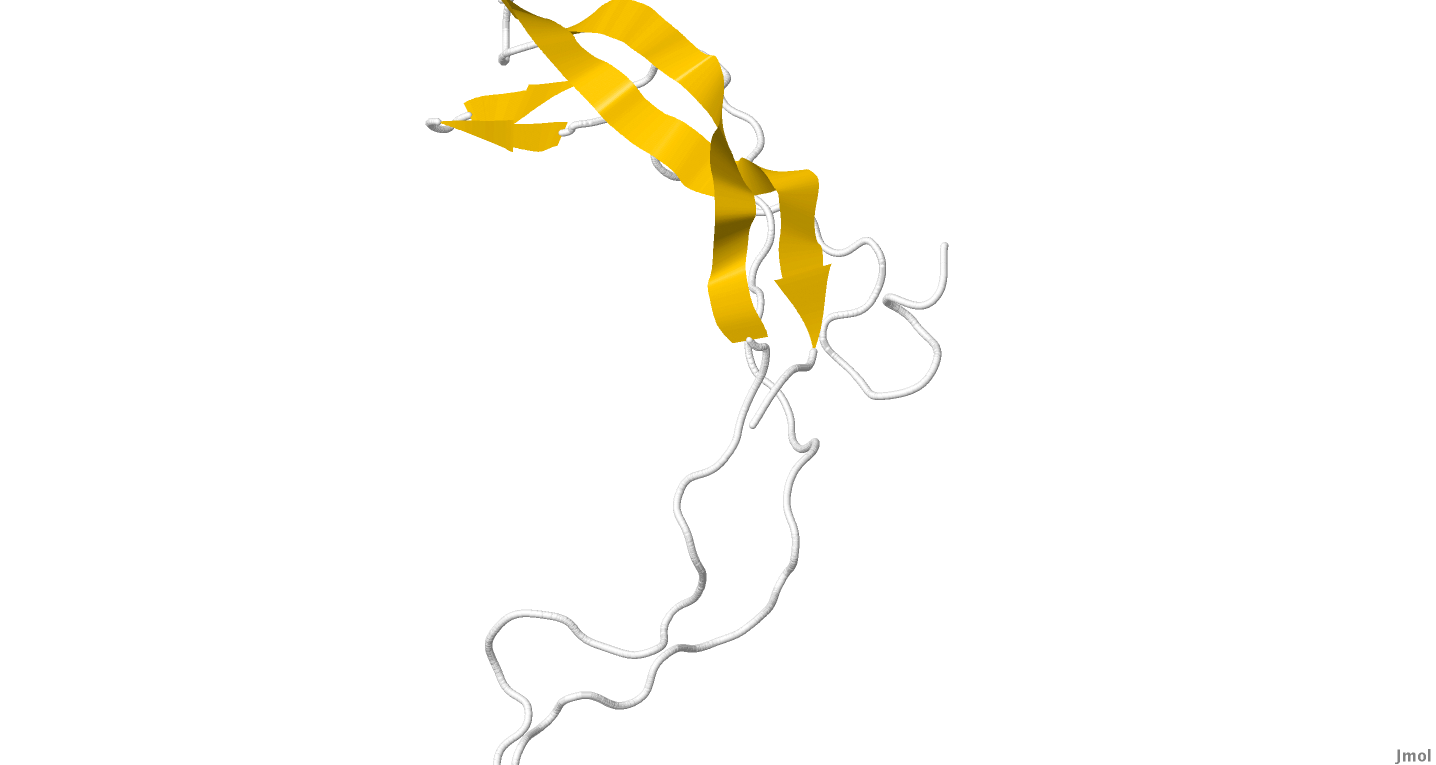

Identifiers
- Aliases: SOST, CDD, SOST1, VBCH, DAND6, sclerostin, Sclerostin
- External IDs: OMIM: 605740; MGI: 1921749; GeneCards: SOST
Available structures
| PDB | Ortholog search: PDBe RCSB |
| PDB | List of PDB id codes 2K8P, 3SOV |

Gene location (Human)
| Chr. | Chromosome 17 (human) |
| Band | 17q21.31 | Start | 43,753,738 bp |
| Band | 17q21.31 | End | 43,758,791 bp |

Gene location (Mouse)
| Chr. | Chromosome 11 (mouse) |
| Band | 11|11 D | Start | 101,853,284 bp |
| Band | 11|11 D | End | 101,857,841 bp |
RNA expression pattern
| Bgee | Human / Mouse (ortholog); Top expressed in: trabecular bone; Descending thoracic aorta; testicle; tibia; ascending aorta; popliteal artery; right coronary artery; tibial arteries; gonad; human kidney / Top expressed in: tunica media of zone of aorta; thoracic aorta; ascending aorta; aortic valve; aortic arch; pulmonary trunk; tail of embryo; calvaria; brachiocephalic artery; trunk of common carotid artery; More reference expression data |
| BioGPS | n/a |
Gene ontology
| Molecular function | transcription factor binding; protein binding; heparin binding |
| Cellular component | extracellular matrix; Golgi apparatus; extracellular region; extracellular space; protein-containing complex; collagen-containing extracellular matrix |
| Biological process | Wnt signaling pathway; negative regulation of BMP signaling pathway; positive regulation of transcription, DNA-templated; response to mechanical stimulus; negative regulation of protein-containing complex assembly; negative regulation of Wnt signaling pathway involved in dorsal/ventral axis specification; cellular response to parathyroid hormone stimulus; ossification; negative regulation of ossification; negative regulation of canonical Wnt signaling pathway |
Sources:Amigo / QuickGO
Orthologs
| Databases | NCBI: entry; OMA: entry |
| Species | Human | Mouse |
| Entrez | 50964 | 74499 |
| Ensembl | ENSG00000167941 | ENSMUSG00000001494 |
| UniProt | Q9BQB4 | Q99P68 |
| RefSeq (mRNA) | NM_025237 | NM_024449 |
| RefSeq (protein) | NP_079513 | NP_077769 |
| Location (UCSC) | Chr 17: 43.75 – 43.76 Mb | Chr 11: 101.85 – 101.86 Mb |
| PubMed search |
- Wikidata
| View/Edit Human | View/Edit Mouse |

Sclerostin

Identifiers
- Symbol: Sclerostin
- Pfam: PF05463
- InterPro: IPR008835
Available protein structures:
- PDB: IPR008835 PF05463 (ECOD; PDBsum)
- AlphaFold: IPR008835; PF05463

Sclerostin is a protein that in humans is encoded by the SOST gene. It is a secreted glycoprotein with a C-terminal cysteine knot-like (CTCK) domain and sequence similarity to the DAN (differential screening-selected gene aberrative in neuroblastoma) family of bone morphogenetic protein (BMP) antagonists. Sclerostin is produced primarily by the osteocyte but is also expressed in other tissues, and has anti-anabolic effects on bone formation.

== Structure ==
The sclerostin protein, with a length of 213 residues, has a secondary structure that has been determined by protein NMR to be 28% beta sheet (6 strands; 32 residues).

== Function ==
Sclerostin, the product of the SOST gene, located on chromosome 17q12–q21 in humans, was originally believed to be a non-classical bone morphogenetic protein (BMP) antagonist. More recently, sclerostin has been identified as binding to LRP5/6 receptors and inhibiting the Wnt signaling pathway. The inhibition of the Wnt pathway leads to decreased bone formation. Although the underlying mechanisms are unclear, it is believed that the antagonism of BMP-induced bone formation by sclerostin is mediated by Wnt signaling, but not BMP signaling pathways. Sclerostin is expressed in osteocytes and some chondrocytes and it inhibits bone formation by osteoblasts.

Sclerostin production by osteocytes is inhibited by parathyroid hormone, mechanical loading, estrogen and cytokines including prostaglandin E_{2}, oncostatin M, cardiotrophin-1 and leukemia inhibitory factor. Sclerostin production is increased by calcitonin. Thus, osteoblast activity is self regulated by a negative feedback system.

== Clinical significance ==
Mutations in the gene that encodes the sclerostin protein are associated with disorders associated with high bone mass, sclerosteosis and van Buchem disease.

van Buchem disease is an autosomal recessive skeletal disease characterized by bone overgrowth. It was first described in 1955 as "hyperostosis corticalis generalisata familiaris", but was given the current name in 1968. Excessive bone formation is most prominent in the skull, mandible, clavicle, ribs and diaphyses of long bones and bone formation occurs throughout life. It is a very rare condition with about 30 known cases in 2002. In 1967 van Buchem characterized the disease in 15 patients of Dutch origin. Patients with sclerosteosis are distinguished from those with van Buchem disease because they are often taller and have hand malformations. In the late 1990s, scientists at the company Chiroscience and the University of Cape Town determined that a "single mutation" in the gene was responsible for the disorder.

=== Sclerostin antibody ===
An antibody for sclerostin is being developed because of the protein's specificity to bone. Its use has increased bone growth in preclinical trials in osteoporotic rats and monkeys. In a Phase I study, a single dose of anti-sclerostin antibody from Amgen (Romosozumab) increased bone density in the hip and spine in healthy men and postmenopausal women and the drug was well tolerated. In a Phase II trial, one year of the antibody treatment in osteoporotic women increased bone density more than bisphosphonate and teriparatide treatment; it had mild injection side effects. A Phase II trial of a monoclonal human antibody to sclerostin from Eli Lilly had positive effects on post-menopausal women. Monthly treatments of the antibody for one year increased the bone mineral density of the spine and hip by 18 percent and 6 percent, respectively, compared to the placebo group. In a Phase III trial, one year of Romosozumab treatment in post-menopausal women reduced the risk of vertebral fractures compared to the placebo group. It also increased the bone mineral density in the lumbar spine (13.3% versus 0.0%), femoral neck (5.2% versus −0.7%) and total hip (6.8% versus 0.0%) compared to the placebo group. Adverse events were balanced between the groups. Sclerostin has significance within the field of dentistry and regenerative strategies which target sclerostin are in development. In April 2019, the Food and Drug Administration approved Romosozumab for use in women with a very high risk of osteoporotic fracture. It was also approved for use in Japan and the European Union in 2019.
