= SOCS3 =

Protein

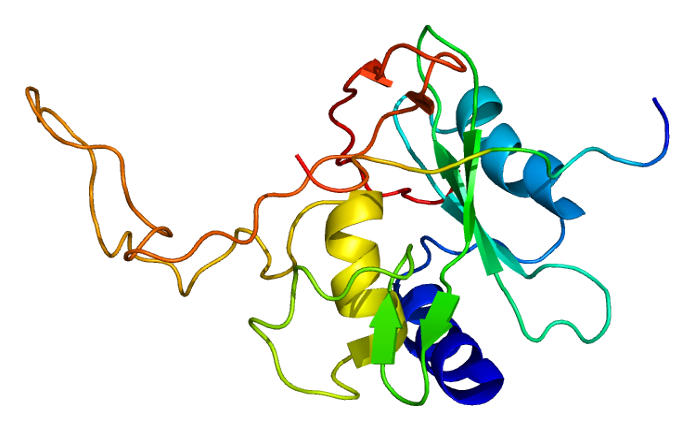

Identifiers
- Aliases: SOCS3, ATOD4, CIS3, Cish3, SOCS-3, SSI-3, SSI3, suppressor of cytokine signaling 3
- External IDs: OMIM: 604176; MGI: 1201791; GeneCards: SOCS3
Available structures
PDB	Ortholog search: PDBe RCSB
PDB	List of PDB id codes 2BBU, 2HMH, 2JZ3, 4GL9

Gene location (Human)
Chr.	Chromosome 17 (human)
Band	17q25.3	Start	78,356,778 bp
Band	17q25.3	End	78,360,077 bp

Gene location (Mouse)
Chr.	Chromosome 11 (mouse)
Band	11|11 E2	Start	117,856,905 bp
Band	11|11 E2	End	117,860,873 bp
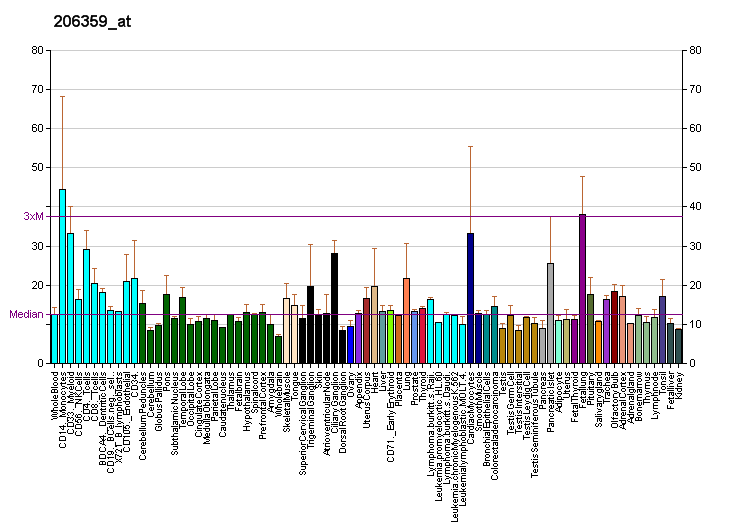

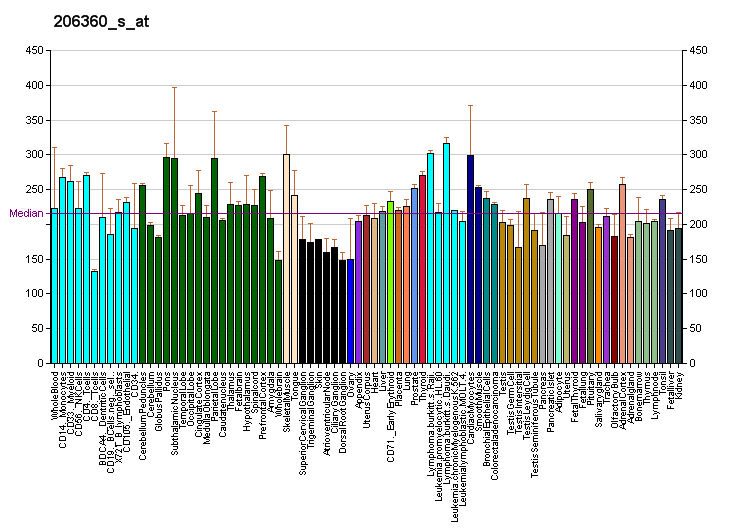
RNA expression pattern
Bgee	Human / Mouse (ortholog); Top expressed in: gastric mucosa; left uterine tube; vena cava; gallbladder; saphenous vein; pericardium; seminal vesicula; upper lobe of left lung; lower lobe of lung; lactiferous duct / Top expressed in: stroma of bone marrow; lumbar spinal ganglion; granulocyte; decidua; internal carotid artery; mesenteric lymph nodes; gastrula; islet of Langerhans; external carotid artery; ciliary body; More reference expression data
BioGPS	More reference expression data
Gene ontology
Molecular function	protein kinase inhibitor activity; protein binding; phosphotyrosine residue binding; 1-phosphatidylinositol-3-kinase regulator activity
Cellular component	cytosol; cytoplasm; phosphatidylinositol 3-kinase complex; intracellular anatomical structure
Biological process	regulation of protein phosphorylation; trophoblast giant cell differentiation; intracellular signal transduction; spongiotrophoblast differentiation; placenta blood vessel development; negative regulation of apoptotic process; negative regulation of insulin receptor signaling pathway; regulation of interferon-gamma-mediated signaling pathway; branching involved in labyrinthine layer morphogenesis; protein ubiquitination; positive regulation of cell differentiation; regulation of cell differentiation; regulation of growth; negative regulation of signal transduction; negative regulation of inflammatory response; negative regulation of protein kinase activity; negative regulation of receptor signaling pathway via JAK-STAT; negative regulation of tyrosine phosphorylation of STAT protein; post-translational protein modification; cellular response to leukemia inhibitory factor; positive regulation of tyrosine phosphorylation of STAT protein; receptor signaling pathway via JAK-STAT; cytokine-mediated signaling pathway; interleukin-6-mediated signaling pathway; regulation of phosphatidylinositol 3-kinase activity; phosphatidylinositol phosphate biosynthetic process
Sources:Amigo / QuickGO
Orthologs
Databases	NCBI: entry; OMA: entry
Species	Human	Mouse
Entrez	9021	12702
Ensembl	ENSG00000184557	ENSMUSG00000053113
UniProt	O14543; Q6FI39	O35718
RefSeq (mRNA)	NM_003955; NM_001378932; NM_001378933	NM_007707
RefSeq (protein)	NP_003946; NP_001365861; NP_001365862; NP_003946.3	NP_031733
Location (UCSC)	Chr 17: 78.36 – 78.36 Mb	Chr 11: 117.86 – 117.86 Mb
PubMed search
- Wikidata
View/Edit Human	View/Edit Mouse

Suppressor of cytokine signaling 3 (SOCS3 or SOCS-3) is a protein that in humans is encoded by the SOCS3 gene. This gene encodes a member of the STAT-induced STAT inhibitor (SSI), also known as suppressor of cytokine signaling (SOCS), family. SSI family members are cytokine-inducible negative regulators of cytokine signaling.

SOCS3 is a conserved gene, found in across the animal kingdom, including Drosophila, chickens, and crocodiles.

== Function ==
The expression of SOCS3 gene is induced by various cytokines, including IL6, IL10, and interferon (IFN)-gamma.

For signaling of IL-6, Epo, GCSF and Leptin, binding of SOCS3 to the respective cytokine receptor has been found to be crucial for the inhibitory function of SOCS3.

Overexpression of SOCS3 inhibits insulin signaling in adipose tissue and the liver, but not in muscle. But deletion of SOCS3 in the skeletal muscle of mice protects against obesity-related insulin resistance.

SOCS3 contributes to both leptin resistance and insulin resistance as a result of increased ceramide synthesis. For that reason, studies have shown that removal of the SOCS gene prevents against insulin resistance in obesity

Studies of the mouse counterpart of this gene suggested the roles of this gene in the negative regulation of fetal liver hematopoiesis, and placental development.

The SOCS3 protein can bind to JAK2 kinase, and inhibits the activity of JAK2 kinase.

== Interactions ==
SOCS3 has been shown to interact with:

- Erythropoietin receptor,
- Glycoprotein 130,
- Insulin-like growth factor 1 receptor,
- Janus kinase 2,
- PTPN11, and
- RAS p21 protein activator 1.

== Regulation ==
There is some evidence that the expression of SOCS3 is regulated by the microRNA miR-203, miR-409-3p and miR-1896.

== See also ==
- SOCS
- JAK-STAT signaling pathway
