= Osteoporosis-pseudoglioma syndrome =

- Specialty: Medical genetics
- Frequency: 0.0001%

Osteoporosis-pseudoglioma syndrome or OPGG is a rare genetic condition characterized by early-onset blindness and severe osteoporosis alongside seemingly random bone fractures.

== Signs and symptoms ==
It is clinically characterized by severe osteoporosis which is usually recognized and posteriorly diagnosed in early childhood. This usually leads to various complications, the primary one being recurrent bone fractures.

Another very common symptom is total blindness, which usually manifests in two ways:

- Severe congenital visual impairment which progresses into total blindness by adulthood
- Congenitally normal vision which rapidly progresses into severe visual impairment by early infancy and total blindness by adulthood

Occasional findings include epilepsy, intellectual disabilities, joint hypermobility, hypotonia, cataracts, microphthalmia, and iris, lens, and vitreous defects.

People with only one copy of the gene mutation involved in this condition (heterozygotes) are at a higher risk of developing exudative vitreoretinopathy and having low bone density, which can consequently result in osteoporosis.

=== Complications ===
The condition is associated with various complications, most of which are osseous (related to bone).

They are the following:

- Recurrent bone fractures
- Bone fracture-associated compressed vertebrae
- Scoliosis
- Generalized limb abnormalities
- Craniotabes
- Short stature

== Anatomy ==
Osteoporosis and the complications which are brought to light by it are caused by a decreased level of minerals within the bones.

The visual impairments are caused by a group of ocular conditions known as pseudoglioma.

== Genetics ==
This condition is caused by autosomal recessive missense mutations in the LRP5 gene, located in the long arm of chromosome 11.

This gene normally provides instructions to make a protein that embeds itself in the outer membrane of various cell types. It works alongside a different receptor protein, frizzled-4 (which is made by the FZD4 gene) to send chemical signams from the outside of the cell to the nucleus of said cell. Both proteins (frizzled-4 and LRP5) participate in the Wnt signaling pathway, which are steps that are involved in the development of cells and tissues. It is important for proliferation (cell division), adhesion (cell attachment), migration (cell movement), etc. The protein LRP5 makes is important for the appropriate development and maintenance of multiple tissues. It is involved in guiding the specialization of retinal cells, in establishing proper blood supply to both the retina and the inner ear, and in regulating bone mineral density, the latter of which gives strength to the bones and make them less likely to break.

The mutations in the gene that causes osteoporosis-pseudoglioma either impaire the cells' ability to produce LRP5 protein or they change the single amino acids in the protein. They cannot insert themselves into the outside of the cell, which in turn does not allow them to do their function. Loss-of-function mutations in the LRP5 protein alter the chemical signaling pathways involved in normal bone formation and retinal development, causing the abnormalities that patients with this condition show.

== Diagnosis ==
This condition can be diagnosed through genetic testing, radiographs, and eye exams.

== Treatment ==
Treatment is done on the symptoms themselves.

== Prevalence ==
Worldwide, this condition has an estimated prevalence of 1 out of every 2,000,000 live births.

== History ==
It was first discovered in 1972 by Bianchine et al. when they described three families with osteogenesis imperfecta, pseudoglioma, retinoblastoma, and recurrence of bone fractures.
