= Diaphanospondylodysostosis =

- Other names: DSD
- Specialty: Medical genetics
- Symptoms: small chest; abnormal vertebral segmentation; widely spaced eyes; low-set ears; short nose
- Usual onset: Antenatal
- Duration: Lifelong
- Causes: Genetic mutation in the BMPER gene
- Treatment: Supportive
- Frequency: <1 / 1,000,000

Diaphanospondylodysostosis (DSD) is a skeletal dysplasia of genetic cause with an estimated prevalence of less than 1 in 1,000,000. It is inherited through an autosomal recessive pattern and is lethal in early infancy. Infants with the condition often have a small chest, abnormal vertebral segmentation and posterior rib gaps. The condition is caused by mutations in the BMPER gene.

== Signs and symptoms ==
This condition is characterized by a distinct combination of skeletal malformations and craniofacial anomalies that are visible at birth or through prenatal imaging. Kidney anomalies such as multicystic kidneys are common features of the disorder. Craniofacial features include widely spaced eyes (ocular hypertelorism), epicanthal folds of the eyelids, a depressed nasal bridge, a short nose, and low-set ears. The primary skeletal features of DSD include abnormal vertebral segmentation, a small chest, and posterior rib gaps.

== Causes ==
DSD is inherited through an autosomal recessive pattern.

DSD is an autosomal recessive disorder caused by a genetic mutation that impacts early skeletal development.

=== Genetics ===
DSD originates on chromosome 7p14, where mutations disrupt the functioning of the BMPER gene. These genetic changes usually present as either a homozygous or a compound heterozygous trait. Various types of mutations affect the gene, including nonsense, missense and splice-site mutations.

== Diagnosis ==
The condition can be suspected before birth through prenatal ultrasound imaging, which typically reveals characteristic skeletal traits and a small chest cavity. After DSD is suspected, molecular genetic testing is used to identify mutations in the BMPER gene to make a definitive diagnosis.

== Management ==
No cure or therapy has been found for the condition. Instead medical management is supportive and centered on symptomatic care. The small chest cavity often leads to severe respiratory insufficiency at birth. Interventions focus mainly on respiratory support and maximizing infant comfort.

== Epidemiology ==
The disorder is a very rare condition, with fewer than 20 cases ever recorded in medical history around the world. It is estimated to affect less than one in a million people.
