= Sclerosteosis =

Disorder characterized by excessive bone formation

Sclerosteosis is an autosomal recessive disorder characterized by bone overgrowth. It was first described in 1958 but given the current name in 1967. Excessive bone formation is most prominent in the skull, mandible and tubular bones. It can cause facial distortion and syndactyly. Increased intracranial pressure can cause sudden death in patients. It is a rare disorder that is most prominent in the Afrikaner population in South Africa (40 patients), but there have also been cases of American and Brazilian families. As of April 2025, inhibition of Wnt-specific acyltransferase, an enzyme coded for by the gene PORCN (nicknamed "porcupine"), has emerged under the nickname "porcupine inhibition" as a promising pharmacological treatment for severe sclerosteosis pathologies and is currently in preclinical research.

== Cause ==
Sclerosteosis is caused by mutations in the SOST gene that encodes the sclerostin protein. The sclerostin protein is necessary in inhibiting the Wnt signaling pathway. Wnt signalling results in increased osteoblast activity and RANKL synthesis. Sclerostin therefore increases bone formation by indirectly inhibiting RANKL synthesis and thus osteoclast activation.

== See also ==
- Van Buchem disease
