= Van Buchem disease =

Genetic skeletal disease

Van Buchem disease, or hyperostosis corticalis generalisata, is an autosomal recessive skeletal disease which is characterised by uninhibited bone growth, especially in the mandible, skull and ribs.

The disease was first described in 1955 by Frans van Buchem, when describing two patients of the same family in Urk in the Netherlands. The cause, he found, was that the bone was produced faster than the body broke it down, making it much thicker as the patient got older. The first symptoms experienced by the affected were often deafness and paralysis of the face, caused by the growing bone pinching the nerves. This condition can be traced to a deletion on chromosome 17q. As the disease is recessive, a child will only be affected by the disease if both of the parents are carriers and the child is homozygous for the allele, meaning that they have the allele in duplicate. The gene involved is SOST, and by extension the protein involved is sclerostin. There have been attempts to relieve a patient affected by van Buchem disease: "A large bilateral frontoparietal craniotomy and decompression of the foramen magnum resulted in almost complete relief of his symptoms."

== Urk ==
Fewer than 30 patients are confirmed to be affected by this disease; 22 of them are from the Netherlands, and of these, 14 are from Urk specifically. The area of Urk was for centuries an island in the Zuiderzee until in 1942 the surrounding seafloor was reclaimed. Despite the resulting facilitation of residents' access to other areas, cultural factors originating in the area's former isolation have led residents to maintain a mostly closed community through practices including nearly uniform endogamy. These practices have both short-run and long-run effects significantly raising the average degree of consanguinity between pairs of potential parents: At any given time, the exclusion of less closely related persons from the set of potential alternative partners increases the average degree of consanguinity across those matches that are formed. In the long run, it not only continues that same effect across generations but effectively halves the community population's growth rate relative to that of communities that welcome outsiders as childbearing partners and accept into the community even children having only one native community member as a parent. This combination of effects has increased the intra-community incidence of certain hereditary disorders, including Van Buchem's; of carrier status for the autosomal recessive conditions among those disorders; and of some physical traits not clinically regarded as anomalous.

== See also ==
- Sclerosterosis
- Worth syndrome
