= DKK4 =

Protein-coding gene in the species Homo sapiens

Identifiers
- Aliases: DKK4, DKK-4, dickkopf WNT signaling pathway inhibitor 4
- External IDs: OMIM: 605417; MGI: 2385299; GeneCards: DKK4

Gene location (Human)
Chr.	Chromosome 8 (human)
Band	8p11.21	Start	42,374,063 bp
Band	8p11.21	End	42,377,229 bp

Gene location (Mouse)
Chr.	Chromosome 8 (mouse)
Band	8|8 A2	Start	23,114,059 bp
Band	8|8 A2	End	23,117,563 bp
RNA expression pattern
Bgee	Human / Mouse (ortholog); Top expressed in: testicle; middle frontal gyrus; buccal mucosa cell; cerebellar hemisphere; olfactory zone of nasal mucosa; right hemisphere of cerebellum; palpebral conjunctiva; mucosa of esophagus; islet of Langerhans; duodenum / Top expressed in: urethra; main bronchus; hair; pretectal area; embryo; thyroid gland; pharynx; embryo; morula; tongue; More reference expression data
BioGPS	n/a
Gene ontology
Molecular function	molecular function; co-receptor binding; receptor antagonist activity
Cellular component	extracellular region; cellular component; extracellular space
Biological process	multicellular organism development; negative regulation of Wnt signaling pathway; Wnt signaling pathway; negative regulation of canonical Wnt signaling pathway; negative regulation of hair follicle placode formation; extracellular negative regulation of signal transduction; negative regulation of signaling receptor activity
Sources:Amigo / QuickGO
Orthologs
Databases	NCBI: entry; OMA: entry
Species	Human	Mouse
Entrez	27121	234130
Ensembl	ENSG00000104371	ENSMUSG00000031535
UniProt	Q9UBT3	Q8VEJ3
RefSeq (mRNA)	NM_014420	NM_145592
RefSeq (protein)	NP_055235	NP_663567
Location (UCSC)	Chr 8: 42.37 – 42.38 Mb	Chr 8: 23.11 – 23.12 Mb
PubMed search
- Wikidata
View/Edit Human	View/Edit Mouse

Dickkopf-related protein 4 is a protein in the Dickkopf family that in humans is encoded by the DKK4 gene.

== In cats ==
In 2021, researchers at the Stanford University School of Medicine discovered that the gene, located on chromosome B1 of the cat genome, is responsible for patterns on cats. During embryonic development, the epidermis develops alternating thick and thin (in terms of depth, not width) regions, previously found to match the striped mackerel or blotchy patterns that would be expressed based on mutations in the embryos' Transmembrane aminopeptidase Q (Taqpep) gene. The genes DKK4 and Wingless Inhibitory Factor 1 (WIF1) both secrete Wnt signaling inhibitors, but in cells where both are upregulated, DKK4 produces much more of its protein than WIF1. In DKK4-positive cells, both Wnt signaling inhibitor and activator genes are upregulated, but inhibitor genes like DKK4 secrete proteins with a larger area of effect. DKK4 expression creates a molecular pre-pattern where the thick epidermal regions will develop, then gradually reduces as the embryo continues to develop. In embryos with the blotchy Taqpep mutation, DKK4 was expressed less and in a broader pattern compared to embryos with the mackerel pattern version of the gene.

DKK4 was also examined in specifically Abyssinian cats, which are known for their “ticked” fur with bands of colors on each hair. Two variants, or alleles, of DKK4, p.Ala18Val and p.Cys63Tyr, were discovered in cats with obscured tabby markings. In some other breeds and non-breeds of cats, the presence of p.Ala18Val also correlated with the Ticked phenotype, while other variants correlated with the Non-Ticked phenotype. These variants caused loss of function of the DKK4 gene and smaller, more tightly packed dark areas.
