= BMP binding endothelial regulator =

Protein-coding gene in the species Homo sapiens

BMPER

Identifiers
- Aliases: BMPER, CRIM3, CV-2, CV2, BMP binding endothelial regulator
- External IDs: OMIM: 608699; MGI: 1920480; GeneCards: BMPER

Gene location (Human)
Chr.	Chromosome 7 (human)
Band	7p14.3	Start	33,904,308 bp
Band	7p14.3	End	34,156,427 bp

Gene location (Mouse)
Chr.	Chromosome 9 (mouse)
Band	9|9 A3	Start	23,134,372 bp
Band	9|9 A3	End	23,396,496 bp
RNA expression pattern
Bgee	Human / Mouse (ortholog); Top expressed in: upper lobe of left lung; prefrontal cortex; right lung; cerebellar hemisphere; testicle; appendix; right hemisphere of cerebellum; gonad; Brodmann area 9; stromal cell of endometrium / Top expressed in: calvaria; left lung lobe; ureter; hand; fossa; medial ganglionic eminence; trigeminal ganglion; facial motor nucleus; lens; otic vesicle; More reference expression data
BioGPS	n/a
Orthologs
Databases	NCBI: entry; OMA: entry
Species	Human	Mouse
Entrez	168667	73230
Ensembl	ENSG00000164619	ENSMUSG00000031963
UniProt	Q8N8U9	Q8CJ69
RefSeq (mRNA)	NM_133468; NM_001365308	NM_028472
RefSeq (protein)	NP_597725	NP_082748
Location (UCSC)	Chr 7: 33.9 – 34.16 Mb	Chr 9: 23.13 – 23.4 Mb
PubMed search
- Wikidata
View/Edit Human	View/Edit Mouse

BMP binding endothelial regulator is a protein that in humans is encoded by the BMPER gene.

== Transcription ==
KLF15 is a strong and direct activator of BMPER expression which is inhibited by SP1. BMPER is inhibited by endothelin-1, which may be mediated by endothelin inhibition of KLF15.

== Clinical significance ==
Pathogenic variants in the BMPER gene cause diaphanospondylodysostosis.
