= Wognum =

- Village
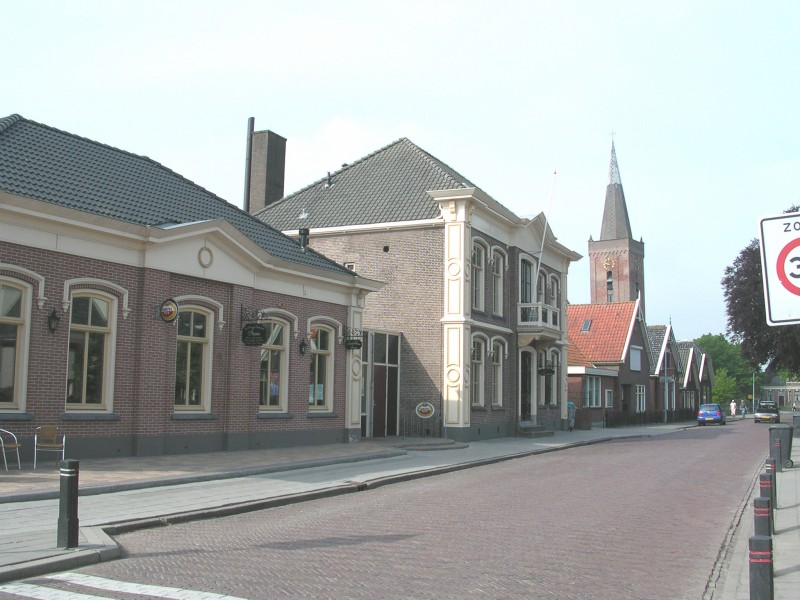
- Wognum

- Coat of arms

- Location in the Netherlands Location in the province of North Holland in the Netherlands
- Coordinates: 52°40′N 5°1′E
- Country: Kingdom of the Netherlands
- Constituent country: Netherlands
- Province: North Holland
- Municipality: Medemblik

Area
  - Village: 13.19 km^{2} (5.09 sq mi)
- Elevation: 0.1 m (0.33 ft)

Population (2025)
  - Village: 6,260
  - Density: 475/km^{2} (1,230/sq mi)
  - Urban: 5,755
  - Rural: 505
- Time zone: UTC+1 (CET)
  - Summer (DST): UTC+2 (CEST)
- Postal code: 1687
- Dialing code: 0229

Wognum (Dutch pronunciation: [ˈʋɔɣnʏm]) is a former municipality and a town in the Netherlands, in the province of North Holland. Wognum received city rights in 1392 but lost them in 1426. In 2007 it merged with the municipalities of Medemblik and Noorder-Koggenland into an enlarged municipality of Medemblik.

== Population centres ==
The former municipality of Wognum included the towns and villages of Nibbixwoud, Wognum and Zwaagdijk-West, and the hamlet of Wijzend.

== History ==
Wognum was formed around 900, confirmed by archaeological finds. In addition, there is evidence that the area was already inhabited around the Bronze Age. Hand axes and arrowheads from that period were found in the area between the current streets of Oosterwijzend and Dorpsstraat in Wognum.

In 980 the city was first mentioned in a church list of the Abbey of Echternach, when the place was named Wokgunge. In a charter of 1063 it was called Woggunghem. There was a chapel, belonging to the Abbey of Heiloo, on the site of the Reformed Church of Wognum. Later spellings included Wognem (1083), Woghenem (1156) and Woggenum (1544). The name could refer to the place of the person or family Wok or Wokke. In addition to the West Frisian names Woggem and Woggelum the name was sometimes even (incorrectly) written Wochnum, analogous to Wochmar and the old Dutch Wochmeer (Wogmeer).

Wognum is located on the shore of an ancient stream. The shore is composed of sandy soil. Just outside the residential center it is located between Oude Gouw - Kerkstraat and the old peat streams at Baarsdorpermeer/Lekermeer. This is a remnant of the reclamation period from the early Middle Ages. This includes the Kromme Leek, a stream that starts at the Baarsdorpermeer meandering along Wognum through Zwaagdijk, and ends at Medemblik. The winding course is preserved as much as possible at the time of the later land consolidation between Wognum and Medemblik.

In the 15th century, fishing was the main source of income. In the 17th century Wognum greatly benefited from the shipping industry of the nearby city of Hoorn. Despite the fact that Wognum had an agricultural character in the 19th century, when in 1979 a new coat of arms for the newly amalgamated municipality of Wognum was created, the three basses from the amalgamated municipality of Nibixwoud appeared on the coat of arms.

In both Wognum and Nibbixwoud there are thousands of fruit trees. Fruit is an important part of the agricultural sector. The layout of Wognum is a combination of agricultural buildings and more urban development in the center.

== Museum / Railway connections ==
Wognum is one of the stops of the Hoorn–Medemblik heritage railway.

== Local government ==
The former municipal council of Wognum consisted of 13 seats, which at the final local election in 2002 were divided as follows:

- CDA - 6 seats
- D66 - 3 seats
- PvdA - 2 seats
- VVD - 2 seats

Wognum became a part of the new merged Medemblik municipality on 1 January 2007.

== People from Wognum ==
- John Appel (filmmaker)
- Cor Bakker, pianist
- Frans van Buchem, physician
- Edith van Dijk, swimmer
- Jeroen Tesselaar, footballer
