= John Appel (filmmaker) =

Dutch documentary filmmaker

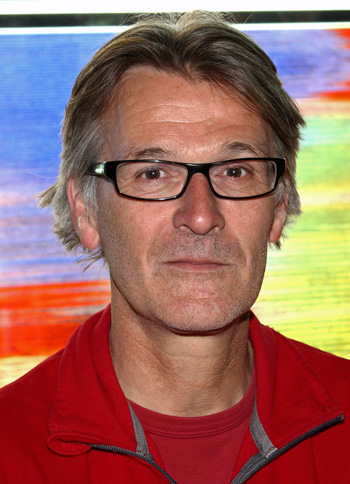
- John Appel in 2009
- Born: 25 November 1958 (age 67); The Netherlands
- Occupation: Documentary Filmmaker
- Years active: 1990s–
- Notable work: Johnny Meijer; Dodengang; The Player

John Appel (Wognum, 25 November 1958) is a Dutch documentary filmmaker.

== Works ==
Aside from directing documentaries John Appel has also been a cameraman for several documentaries and youth series. Since 2001 he has also been a visiting professor at the Netherlands Film and Television Academy. In 1999 John Appel was known to a large audience for the documentary Zij Gelooft in Mij (She believes in me). The movie signalled also signalled another revival in the career its main subject, André Hazes.

=== Documentaries ===
In 1999, Zij Gelooft In Mij was selected as the best film at IDFA and also won the Joris Ivens Award. In the film André Hazes was closely followed around for ten months. The torch followed the popular singer from performances abroad to his own house. The film sketches a picture of a man that often comes up the pole with his nerves and therefore leads a lonely and sometimes hard life.

In the documentary Het Beloofde Land, John Appel went on a search for the story behind the newspaper story "Man ligt maand lang dood in flat" ("Man lies dead in flat for a month"). In this moving film, Appel tries to find an answer to the question of who in the event of a forgotten death does the moral responsibility lie. Should neighbours, family, friends or colleagues had noticed? Appel directed this film in the framework of the project De tien geboden on IKON. Jos de Putter, Karin Junger, Pieter Fleury and Heddy Honingmann, among others, also contributed to this series. The series was an idea by documentary producer Paul de Bont.

The documentary De laatste overwinning followed the residents of the Civetta District in Siena as they prepared for the local horse race in Palio. It is already 24 years after Civetta won the annual race. It is a heavy science for them, because the race carries enormous weight for them. The climax comes with the final bloodcurdling race, where the nerves of the spectators and participants of the race can be felt.

In the documentary The Player, Appel investigates some gambler moves and why their addiction is so difficult to control. Inspired by the adventurous but also tragic life of his father, in this documentary John Appel goes on a search for the true nature of the player. On the basis of portraits of a bookmaker at the horse races, a poker player, and a captured "rasoplichter" ("swindler by nature"), everyone in the art of winning and losing has contributed to Appel's own psychological portrait of his father, showing that he was not just an ordinary gambler but also a true player.

== Filmography ==
- Johnny Meijer (1993)
- De romantische lijn (1997)
- Zij gelooft in mij (1999)
- Dodengang (1999)
- Senegal Surplace (2003)
- De laatste overwinning (2004)
- There goes my heart (2005)
- The Player (2009)
- Wrong time wrong place (2012)
- Eritrea Stars (2015)
- Sprekend Nederland (2018)
- Once The Dust Settles (2020)
- F*ck Normaal (2025)
