= KLF15 =

Protein-coding gene in the species Homo sapiens

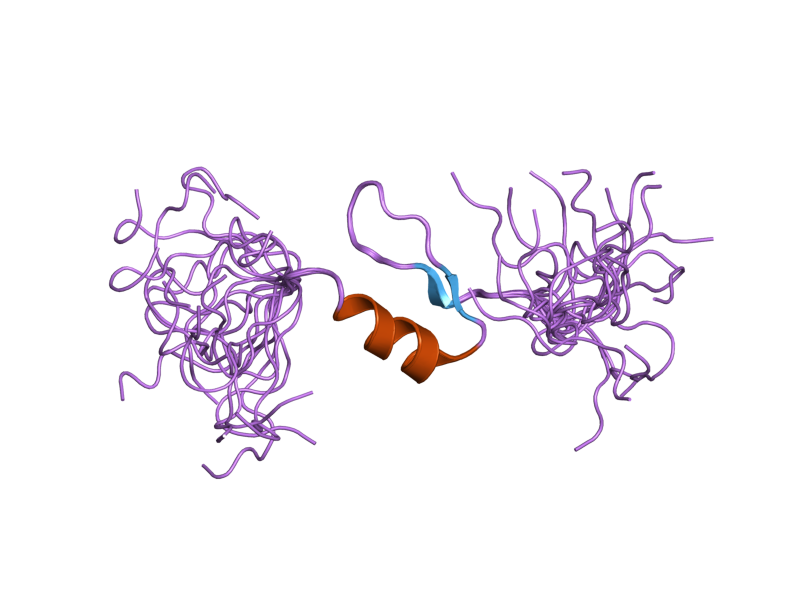

Identifiers
- Aliases: KLF15, KKLF, Kruppel-like factor 15, Kruppel like factor 15
- External IDs: OMIM: 606465; MGI: 1929988; GeneCards: KLF15
Available structures
| PDB | Ortholog search: PDBe RCSB |
| PDB | List of PDB id codes 2ENT |

Gene location (Human)
| Chr. | Chromosome 3 (human) |
| Band | 3q21.3 | Start | 126,342,635 bp |
| Band | 3q21.3 | End | 126,357,408 bp |

Gene location (Mouse)
| Chr. | Chromosome 6 (mouse) |
| Band | 6|6 D1 | Start | 90,439,558 bp |
| Band | 6|6 D1 | End | 90,452,220 bp |
RNA expression pattern
| Bgee | Human / Mouse (ortholog); Top expressed in: parotid gland; cardia; lower lobe of lung; sural nerve; renal medulla; gastric mucosa; right lobe of liver; inferior ganglion of vagus nerve; ventral tegmental area; external globus pallidus / Top expressed in: left lobe of liver; lacrimal gland; interventricular septum; vestibular membrane of cochlear duct; right kidney; proximal tubule; muscle of thigh; masseter muscle; parotid gland; retinal pigment epithelium; More reference expression data |
| BioGPS | n/a |
Gene ontology
| Molecular function | DNA-binding transcription factor activity; DNA binding; DNA-binding transcription activator activity, RNA polymerase II-specific; protein binding; metal ion binding; nucleic acid binding; DNA-binding transcription factor activity, RNA polymerase II-specific; RNA polymerase II transcription regulatory region sequence-specific DNA binding; RNA polymerase II cis-regulatory region sequence-specific DNA binding |
| Cellular component | nucleus |
| Biological process | regulation of gene expression; glomerular visceral epithelial cell differentiation; positive regulation of transcription, DNA-templated; negative regulation of peptidyl-lysine acetylation; glial cell differentiation; cardiac muscle hypertrophy in response to stress; regulation of transcription, DNA-templated; positive regulation of transcription by RNA polymerase II; transcription, DNA-templated; transcription by RNA polymerase II; positive regulation of glucose import; regulation of transcription by RNA polymerase II; cellular glucose homeostasis; response to insulin; cellular response to peptide |
Sources:Amigo / QuickGO
Orthologs
| Databases | NCBI: entry; OMA: entry |
| Species | Human | Mouse |
| Entrez | 28999 | 66277 |
| Ensembl | ENSG00000163884 | ENSMUSG00000030087 |
| UniProt | Q9UIH9 | Q9EPW2 |
| RefSeq (mRNA) | NM_014079 | NM_023184; NM_001355668 |
| RefSeq (protein) | NP_054798 | NP_075673; NP_001342597 |
| Location (UCSC) | Chr 3: 126.34 – 126.36 Mb | Chr 6: 90.44 – 90.45 Mb |
| PubMed search |
- Wikidata
| View/Edit Human | View/Edit Mouse |

Krüppel-like factor 15 is a protein that in humans is encoded by the KLF15 gene in the Krüppel-like factor family. Its former designation KKLF stands for kidney-enriched Krüppel-like factor.

== Expression ==
Activated glucocorticoid receptor upregulates the expression of KLF15.

KLF15 is increased by fasting and decreased by feeding and insulin via PI3K signalling. KLF15 was increased by glucocorticoid signalling and was also increased by inhibition of PI3K. Insulin and its counteracting hormones regulate the hepatic expression of KLF15. Forced expression of KLF15 in cultured hepatocytes increased both the expression and the promoter activity of the gene for phosphoenolpyruvate carboxykinase (PEPCK).

KLF15 levels in both humans and mice increase two to three times in response to exercise and control the ability of muscle tissue to burn fat and generate force. A deficiency of the KLF15 gene in mice was shown to prevent the efficient burning of fat and prevent mice from sustaining aerobic exercise.

KLF15 in adipose tissue is downregulated in obese mice. aP2-KLF15 Tg mice, which overexpress KLF15, manifest insulin resistance and are resistant to the development of obesity induced by maintenance on a high fat diet. However, they also exhibit improved glucose tolerance as a result of enhanced insulin secretion. The enhancement of insulin secretion resulted from the down-regulation of stearoyl-CoA desaturase-1 (SCD1) in white adipose tissue and a consequently reduced level of oxidative stress. This is supported by the findings that restoration of SCD1 expression in WAT of aP2-KLF15 Tg mice exhibited increased oxidative stress in WAT and reduced insulin secretion with hyperglycemia. The data indicates an example of cross talk between white adipose tissue and pancreatic β cells mediated through modulation of oxidative stress.

Using deletion and mutation analysis, EMSA and ChIP demonstrated that USF1 and Spl can bind to E-box in-80 to-45 and GC-box in-189 to-155 in the KLF15 promoter, respectively, thus regulating the transcription of the KLF15 gene.

== Gene regulation ==
KLF15 binding site in the HSD17B5 promoter leading to the upregulation of testosterone production. In addition KLF15 overexpression in combination with insulin, glucocorticoid, and cAMP stimulated adipogenesis in H295R cells. In silico and RT-PCR analyses showed that the KLF15 gene promoter undergoes alternative splicing in a tissue-specific manner.

KLF15 is a strong and direct activator of BMPER expression which is inhibited by SP1. BMPER is inhibited by endothelin-1, which may be mediated by endothelin inhibition of KLF15.

The LRP5 promoter has a KLF15 binding site.

KLF15 specifically interacts with MEF2A and synergistically activates the GLUT4 promoter via an intact KLF15-binding site proximal to the MEF2A site. Cardiac and skeletal muscle expressed miR-133 regulates the expression of GLUT4 by targeting KLF15 and is involved in metabolic control in cardiomyocytes.

Transforming growth factor-beta1 (TGFbeta1) strongly reduces KLF15 expression. Adenoviral overexpression of KLF15 inhibits basal and TGFbeta1-induced CTGF expression in neonatal rat ventricular fibroblasts. Hearts from KLF15-/- mice subjected to aortic banding exhibited increased CTGF levels and fibrosis. KLF15 inhibits basal and TGFbeta1-mediated induction of the CTGF promoter. KLF15 inhibits recruitment of the co-activator P/CAF to the CTGF promoter with no significant effect on Smad3-DNA binding. KLF15 is implicated as a novel negative regulator of CTGF expression and cardiac fibrosis.

KLF15 inhibits myocardin. TGFbeta mediated activation of p38 MAPK decreases KLF15 permitting the upreg of myocardin and stimulate the expression of serum response factor target genes, such as atrial natriuretic factor eventually leading to left ventricular hypertrophy which often progresses to heart failure.

The combination of KLF15 and Sp1 resulted in a synergistic activation of the acetyl-CoA synthetase 2 (AceCS2) promoter. AceCS2 produces acetyl-CoA for oxidation through the citric acid cycle in the mitochondrial matrix. Fasting upregulated KLF15 which upregulated AceCS2.

Progesterone receptor-mediated induction of Krüppel-like factor 15 (KLF15), which can bind to GC-rich DNA within the E2F1 promoter, is required for maximal induction of E2F1 expression by progestins.

KLF15 may function as an inhibitor of cardiac hypertrophycan by the inhibition of GATA4 and MEF2.

REDD1 and KLF15 are direct target genes of the glucocorticoid receptor (GR) in skeletal muscle. KLF15 inhibits mTOR activity via a distinct mechanism involving BCAT2 gene activation. KLF15 upregulates the expression of the E3 ubiquitin ligases atrogin-1 and SMuRF1 genes and negatively modulates myofiber size.

Two kidney-specific CLC chloride channels, CLC-K1 and CLC-K2, are transcriptionally regulated on a tissue-specific basis. KLF15 (KKLF) is abundantly expressed in the liver, kidney, heart, and skeletal muscle. In the kidney, KKLF protein was localized in interstitial cells, mesangial cells, and nephron segments where CLC-K1 and CLC-K2 were not expressed. KKLF and MAZ proteins exhibited sequence-specific binding to the CLC-K1 GA element. MAZ had a strong activating effect on CLC-K1 gene transcription but KKLF coexpression with MAZ appeared to block the activating effect of MAZ.

== Clinical significance ==
KLF15 plays an important role in regulation of the expression of genes for gluconeogenic and amino acid-degrading enzymes and that the inhibitory effect of metformin on gluconeogenesis is mediated at least in part by downregulation of KLF15 and consequent attenuation of the expression of such genes.

Klf15 concentrations are markedly reduced in failing human hearts and in human aortic aneurysm tissues. Mice deficient in Klf15 develop heart failure and aortic aneurysms in a p53-dependent and p300 acetyltransferase-dependent fashion. KLF15 activation inhibits p300-mediated acetylation of p53. Conversely, Klf15 deficiency leads to hyperacetylation of p53 in the heart and aorta, a finding that is recapitulated in human tissues. Finally, Klf15-deficient mice are rescued by p53 deletion or p300 inhibition. These findings highlight a molecular perturbation common to the pathobiology of heart failure and aortic aneurysm formation and suggest that manipulation of KLF15 function may be a productive approach to treat these morbid diseases.

The expression of the KLF15 gene is markedly up-regulated during the differentiation of 3T3-L1 preadipocytes into adipocytes. Ectopic expression of KLF15 in NIH 3T3 or C2C12 cells triggered both lipid accumulation and the expression of PPAR-γ in the presence of inducers of adipocyte differentiation. Ectopic expression of C/EBPbeta, C/EBPdelta, or C/EBPalpha in 3T3 cells also elicited the expression of KLF15 in the presence of inducers of adipocyte differentiation. KLF15 and C/EBPalpha act synergistically to increase the activity of the PPARgamma2 gene promoter in 3T3-L1 adipocytes demonstrating that KLF15 plays an essential role in adipogenesis in 3T3-L1 cells through its regulation of PPAR gamma expression.

The minimal transactivation domain of erythroid Krüppel-like factor EKLFTAD) has two functional subdomains EKLFTAD1 and EKLFTAD2 of which EKLFTAD2 is conserved in KLF15. EKLFTAD2 binds the amino-terminal PH domain of the Tfb1/p62 subunit of TFIIH (Tfb1PH/p62PH) and four domains of CREB-binding protein/p300.

KLF15 is a novel transcriptional activator for hepatitis B virus core and surface promoters. It is possible that KLF15 may serve as a potential therapeutic target to reduce HBV gene expression and viral replication.

Circadian control of KLF15 expression controls the expression of kChIP2 which affects how potassium flows out of heart cells. Too much or too little of KLF15 or kChIP2 may result in arrhythmias.

In rodents KLF15 appears to control the actions of estradiol and progesterone in the endometrium by inhibiting the production of MCM2, a protein involved in DNA synthesis raising the possibility of preventing or treating endometrial and breast cancer and other diseases related to estrogen by promoting the action of KLF15.
