= Frans van Buchem =

20th century Dutch physician and professor

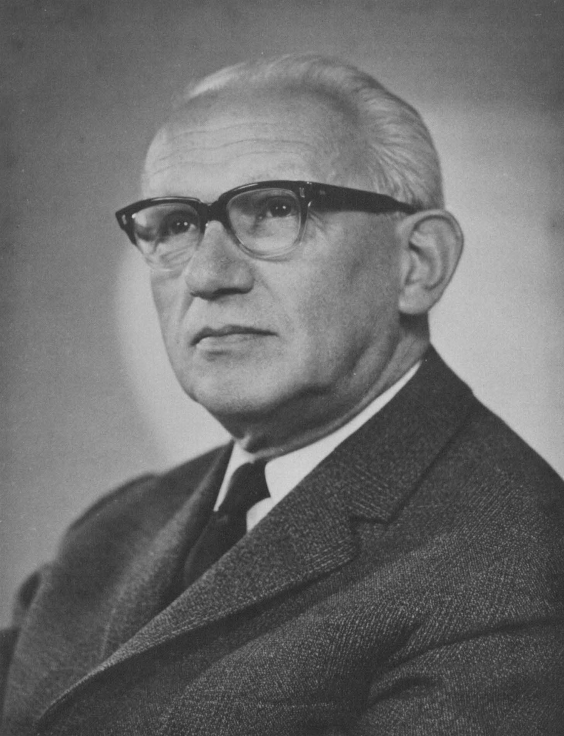
- Frans van Buchem
- Born: 30 November 1897; Wognum, Netherlands
- Died: 1 August 1979 (aged 81); Tilburg, Netherlands
- Known for: Van Buchem disease
- Scientific career
- Fields: Internal Medicine
- Workplaces: St Elisabeth Hospital
- Doctoral advisor: Willem Einthoven

Franciscus Stephanus Petrus (Frans) van Buchem (30 November 1897 – 1 August 1979) was a Dutch physician and professor, known for the discovery of Van Buchem disease, which was named after him. He married Elisabeth Euphemia Maria Christiana Nuijens in January, 1930, aged 32. His PhD thesis was supervised by Nobel Prize winner Professor Willem Einthoven. Frans was, among other things, the Chief Physician in Internal Medicine of the St Elisabeth Hospital and after the end of World War Two, became a professor of Internal Medicine at the University of Groningen. In 1954, van Buchem diagnosed a patient with what he referred to as hyperosteosis corticales generalisata familiaris, later named Van Buchem disease. A year later, he published an article in Acta Radiologica on the disease.

== Biography ==
=== Youth ===
Frans van Buchem was born on Tuesday, 30 November 1897 in Wognum. His parents were Gerardus Johannes van Buchem (1864-1925) and Louia Johanna Josepha van Gemert (1866-1944). Van Buchem was the sixth of a total of twelve children. He attended the Rijks Hogere Burgerschool in Maastricht. After graduating, he studied medicine in Leiden.

=== Internal Medicine Maastricht 1921-1924 ===
After earning his medical degree in 1921, he became assistant to Dr A. Hintzen in the internal medicine department of the Calvarienberg hospital in Maastricht. During this period, the foundation was laid for his research of the electrocardiogram and the heart. Further, his first publication on diabetes, which he wrote along with Dr A. Hintzen, is dated within this time.

=== Leiden and Thesis 1924 ===
Van Buchem earned his doctorate on 5 June 1924, in Leiden for his research. His paper was titled "De venapols en naar aanleiding daarvan enige beschouwingen over het hart mechanisme" or "Venous pulses and some reflections on the circulatory system". During his studies, he worked for two years as an assistant to Prof. Dr. J. Boeke (microscopic anatomy). His supervisor was the Professor Wilem Einthoven, who received the Nobel Prize for Physiology or Medicine on 24 October later that year for the "discovery for the of the mechanism of the electrocardiogram".

=== Chief Assistant Groningen 1925-1929 ===
After his PhD, van Buchem went to Groningen where he initially worked as an assistant and later as a principal assistant at Polak Daniëls. He trained in radiology under the direction of S. Keyser. In addition to a number of clinical publications of various subjects, eight papers were published that related to electrocardiographic research. During this period, he was appointed internist and medical director in Tilburg. Van Buchem worked with architect Ed Cuypers on the plans for St. Elisabeth Hospital. He made several study trips abroad with Cuypers to learn about hospital construction.

=== Tilburg 1929-1946 ===
In 1929, he moved to Tilburg. During this time, he published a number of papers relating to the X-ray diagnostics of the oesophagus, gastrointestinal tract, and the skeleton. During the Second World War, the first edition of his book "Diseases of the heart and blood vessels" was published. He was prominently known as having an attitude of resistance against the Nazis, along with this, his position as internist and later director of the St. Elisabeth Hospital made him a very prominent citizen in Tilburg. For many years, he was the chairman of the Tilburg department of the Royal Netherlands Society for the Promotion of Medicine. His merits were later recognised in his appointment as an honorary member of the Tilburg department.

=== Groningen 1946-1959 ===
At the age of 48, van Buchem was appointed to the chair for internal medicine in Groningen. He took office with an inaugural lecture on the ‘pathogenesis of diabetes mellitus’. In 1947, the second edition of his "Textbook on diseases of the heart and blood vessels" was published and later in 1950, van Buchem’s second book was published, entitled "Diabetes mellitus".

=== Urk 1954-1970 ===
In 1954, a patient from Urk was admitted with a serious bone disease. The symptoms did not align with the symptoms of any known diseases at the time, and van Buchem began an investigation. A sister of the hospitalised patient was found to have the same disease. In 1955, van Buchem wrote a paper titled "An uncommon familial systemic disease of the skeleton: Hyperostosis corticalis generalisata familiaris" along with H. N. Hadders and R. Ubbens on the two patients, which appeared in Acta Radiologica. The further study of this newly discovered disease was one of the two subjects which dominated the latter years of van Buchem’s scientific research. The disease was named hyperostosis corticalis generalisata but became more widely known as Van Buchem disease or sometimes in foreign literature as Van Buchem’s disease.

=== Zutphen 1960-1974 ===
The other subject which dominated the latter years of his research was atherosclerosis. This study concerned a population study into the occurrence of atherosclerotic cardiovascular diseases in Zutphen. This interest in blood lipids brought him into contact with Frits Böttcher and together, along with a few others, researched atherosclerosis and the deterioration of human arteries. In 1970, an important contribution on pathogenesis appeared in the Proceedings of the Academy.

== As a director ==
Van Buchem’s managerial qualities were reflected in, among other things, his chairmanship of the Netherlands Society for Cardiology and the Netherlands Health Association. The latter of which he was appointed an honorary member in 1968. During his time as a professor, he made many study trips to the United States, where he became particularly aware of the advancements in cardiology and cardiac surgery. In 1952, he was dispatched by the World Health Organization as a member of an international team to India, Burma and Ceylon, with the assignment to lecture and advise developments in cardiology.

== Trivia ==
The road that leads from Ringbaan Zuid to the new Elisabeth hospital on Hilvarenbeekseweg in Tilburg, the Prof. van Buchemlaan, is named after him.
