= Hairy palms and soles =

- This condition is inherited in an autosomal dominant manner.
- Specialty: Dermatology

Hairy palms and soles are both a type of cutaneous condition characterized by a hereditary hypertrichosis affecting the palms and soles. This condition is inherited in an autosomal dominant fashion.

== See also ==
- List of cutaneous conditions
- Masturbation, which an old wives' tale claims causes hairy palms
