= WIF1 =

Protein-coding gene in the species Homo sapiens

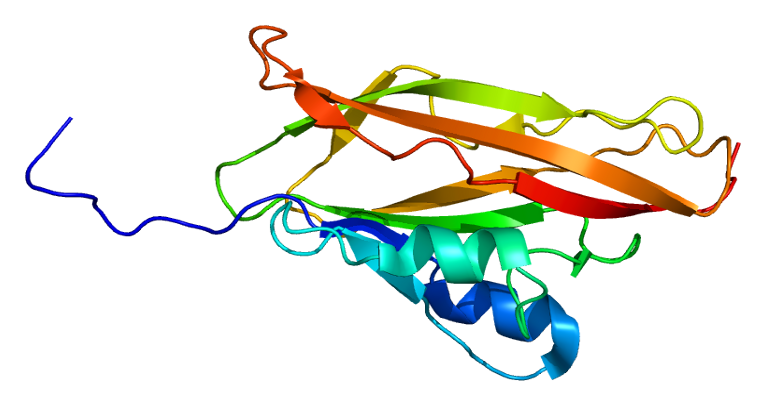
Available structures
PDB	Ortholog search: PDBe RCSB
PDB	List of PDB id codes 2D3J, 2YGN, 2YGO, 2YGP, 2YGQ

Identifiers
- Aliases: WIF1, WIF-1, WNT inhibitory factor 1
- External IDs: OMIM: 605186; MGI: 1344332; HomoloGene: 31430; GeneCards: WIF1; OMA:WIF1 - orthologs

Gene location (Human)
Chr.	Chromosome 12 (human)
Band	12q14.3	Start	65,050,626 bp
Band	12q14.3	End	65,121,305 bp

Gene location (Mouse)
Chr.	Chromosome 10 (mouse)
Band	10|10 D2	Start	120,869,865 bp
Band	10|10 D2	End	120,936,555 bp
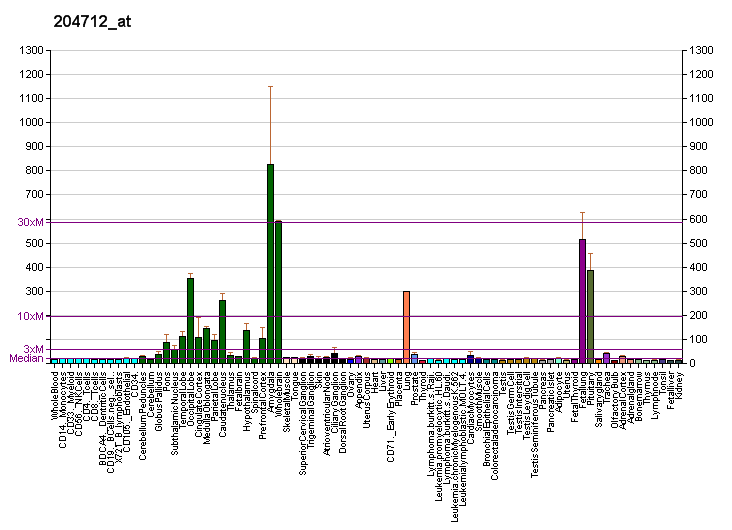
RNA expression pattern
Bgee	Human / Mouse (ortholog); Top expressed in: lower lobe of lung; periodontal fiber; tibia; parotid gland; caudate nucleus; putamen; corpus epididymis; tail of epididymis; nucleus accumbens; trabecular bone / Top expressed in: molar; skin of external ear; dermis; body of femur; seminal vesicula; intercostal muscle; trachea; ankle; calvaria; conjunctival fornix; More reference expression data
BioGPS	More reference expression data
Gene ontology
Molecular function	Wnt-protein binding; protein binding; signaling receptor binding
Cellular component	extracellular region; cell surface
Biological process	multicellular organism development; negative regulation of Wnt signaling pathway; Wnt signaling pathway; signal transduction; positive regulation of fat cell differentiation; anatomical structure development
Sources:Amigo / QuickGO
Orthologs
Species	Human	Mouse
Entrez	11197	24117
Ensembl	ENSG00000156076	ENSMUSG00000020218
UniProt	Q9Y5W5	Q9WUA1
RefSeq (mRNA)	NM_007191	NM_011915
RefSeq (protein)	NP_009122	NP_036045
Location (UCSC)	Chr 12: 65.05 – 65.12 Mb	Chr 10: 120.87 – 120.94 Mb
PubMed search
- Wikidata
View/Edit Human	View/Edit Mouse

Wnt inhibitory factor 1 is a protein that in humans is encoded by the WIF1 gene. WIF1 is a lipid-binding protein that binds to Wnt proteins and prevents them from triggering signalling.

== Function ==
WNT proteins are extracellular signaling molecules involved in the control of embryonic development. This gene encodes a secreted protein, which binds WNT proteins and inhibits their activities. This protein contains a WNT inhibitory factor (WIF) domain and 5 epidermal growth factor (EGF)-like domains. It may be involved in mesoderm segmentation. This protein is found to be present in fish, amphibia and mammals.
