= Kringle domain =

Autonomous protein domains

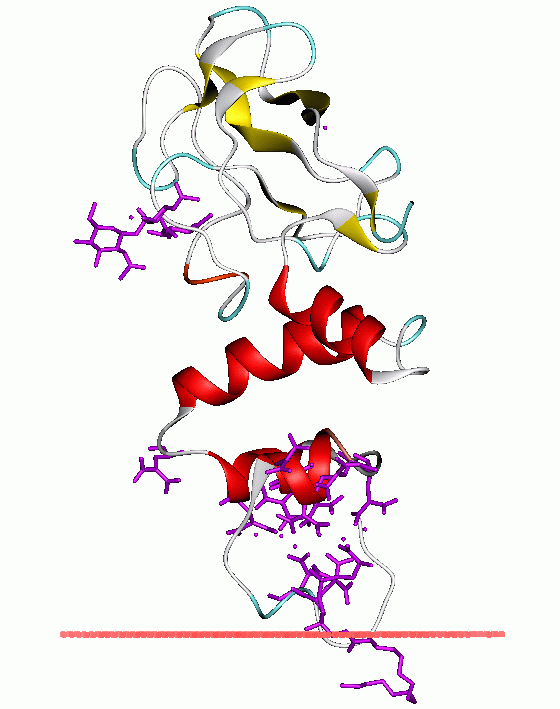
- Fragment of bovine prothrombin in complex with calcium and lysophosphatidylserine. The protein associate with membrane through its alpha-helical GLA domain. The adjacent kringle domain is beta-structural (yellow).

Identifiers
- Symbol: Kringle
- Pfam: PF00051
- InterPro: IPR000001
- SMART: KR
- PROSITE: PDOC00020
- SCOP2: 1pk4 / SCOPe / SUPFAM
- OPM superfamily: 115
- OPM protein: 1h8p
- CDD: cd00108
Available protein structures:
- PDB: IPR000001 PF00051 (ECOD; PDBsum)
- AlphaFold: IPR000001; PF00051

Kringle domains are autonomous protein domains that fold into large loops stabilized by three disulfide linkages. These are important in protein–protein interactions with blood coagulation factors. Their name refers to the Kringle, a Scandinavian pastry which they somewhat resemble.

Kringle domains have been found in plasminogen, hepatocyte growth factors, prothrombin, and apolipoprotein(a).

Kringles are found throughout the blood clotting and fibrinolytic proteins. Kringle domains are believed to play a role in binding mediators (e.g., membranes, other proteins or phospholipids), and in the regulation of proteolytic activity. Kringle domains are characterised by a triple loop, 3-disulfide bridge structure, whose conformation is defined by a number of hydrogen bonds and small pieces of anti-parallel beta-sheet. They are found in a varying number of copies in some plasma proteins including prothrombin and urokinase-type plasminogen activator, which are serine proteases belonging to MEROPS peptidase family S1A.

== Human proteins containing this domain ==
ATF; F12; F2; HABP2; HGF; HGFAC; KREMEN1; KREMEN2; LPA; LPAL2; MST1; PIK3IP1; PLAT; PLAU; PLG; PRSS12; ROR1; ROR2;
