= DKK3 =

Protein-coding gene in the species Homo sapiens

Identifiers
- Aliases: DKK3, REIC, RIG, dickkopf WNT signaling pathway inhibitor 3, CRRL
- External IDs: OMIM: 605416; MGI: 1354952; GeneCards: DKK3

Gene location (Human)
Chr.	Chromosome 11 (human)
Band	11p15.3	Start	11,956,207 bp
Band	11p15.3	End	12,009,769 bp

Gene location (Mouse)
Chr.	Chromosome 7 (mouse)
Band	7|7 F1	Start	111,715,224 bp
Band	7|7 F1	End	111,758,264 bp
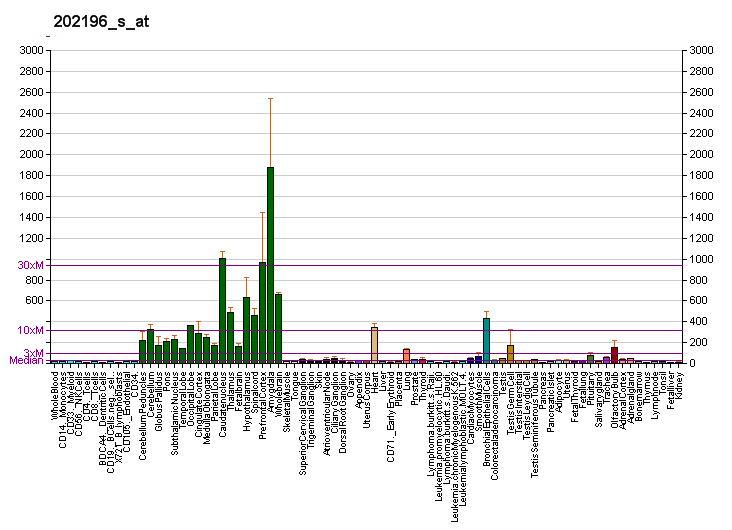

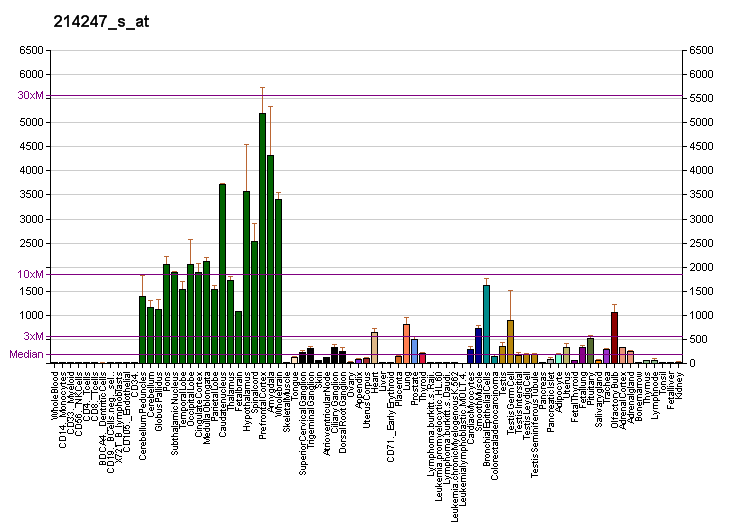
RNA expression pattern
Bgee	Human / Mouse (ortholog); Top expressed in: endothelial cell; Brodmann area 23; middle temporal gyrus; lateral nuclear group of thalamus; external globus pallidus; right auricle of heart; tendon of biceps brachii; entorhinal cortex; pars compacta; vena cava / Top expressed in: epithelium of lens; ciliary body; iris; neural layer of retina; aortic valve; calvaria; ascending aorta; utricle; dentate gyrus of hippocampal formation granule cell; primary motor cortex; More reference expression data
BioGPS	More reference expression data
Gene ontology
Molecular function	co-receptor binding; receptor antagonist activity
Cellular component	extracellular region; extracellular space
Biological process	negative regulation of anti-Mullerian hormone signaling pathway; multicellular organism development; negative regulation of cortisol biosynthetic process; negative regulation of Wnt signaling pathway; anatomical structure morphogenesis; negative regulation of transcription, DNA-templated; Wnt signaling pathway; adrenal gland development; negative regulation of canonical Wnt signaling pathway; regulation of transforming growth factor beta receptor signaling pathway; negative regulation of aldosterone biosynthetic process; extracellular negative regulation of signal transduction; negative regulation of signaling receptor activity
Sources:Amigo / QuickGO
Orthologs
Databases	NCBI: entry; OMA: entry
Species	Human	Mouse
Entrez	27122	50781
Ensembl	ENSG00000050165	ENSMUSG00000030772
UniProt	Q9UBP4	Q9QUN9
RefSeq (mRNA)	NM_001018057; NM_013253; NM_015881; NM_001330220	NM_015814; NM_001360257; NM_001360260; NM_001360261
RefSeq (protein)	NP_001018067; NP_001317149; NP_037385; NP_056965	NP_056629; NP_001347186; NP_001347189; NP_001347190
Location (UCSC)	Chr 11: 11.96 – 12.01 Mb	Chr 7: 111.72 – 111.76 Mb
PubMed search
- Wikidata
View/Edit Human	View/Edit Mouse

Dickkopf-related protein 3 is a protein in the Dickkopf family that in humans is encoded by the DKK3 gene.

This gene encodes a protein that is a member of the dickkopf family. The secreted protein contains two cysteine rich regions and is involved in embryonic development through its interactions with the Wnt signaling pathway. The expression of this gene is decreased in a variety of cancer cell lines and it may function as a tumor suppressor gene. Alternative splicing results in multiple transcript variants encoding the same protein.
