= DKK1 =

Protein-coding gene in the species Homo sapiens

Identifiers
- Aliases: DKK1, DKK-1, SK, dickkopf WNT signaling pathway inhibitor 1
- External IDs: OMIM: 605189; MGI: 1329040; GeneCards: DKK1
Available structures
PDB	Ortholog search: PDBe RCSB
PDB	List of PDB id codes 3S2K, 3S8V, 3SOQ, 5FWW

Gene location (Human)
Chr.	Chromosome 10 (human)
Band	10q21.1	Start	52,314,281 bp
Band	10q21.1	End	52,318,042 bp

Gene location (Mouse)
Chr.	Chromosome 19 (mouse)
Band	19|19 C1	Start	30,523,263 bp
Band	19|19 C1	End	30,527,065 bp
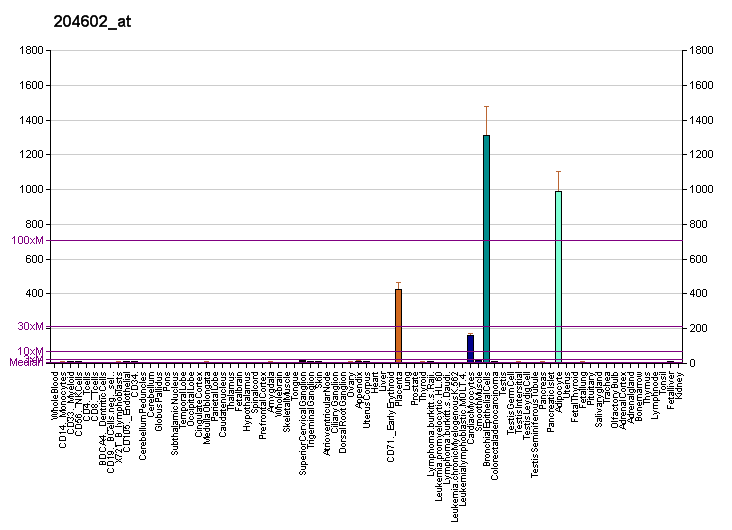
RNA expression pattern
Bgee	Human / Mouse (ortholog); Top expressed in: decidua; stromal cell of endometrium; mucosa of urinary bladder; epithelium of esophagus; tibia; canal of the cervix; gonad; sperm; skin of leg; vagina / Top expressed in: membranous bone; mandible; desmocranium; calvaria; eyelid; Jacobson's organ; molar; dermis; fossa; maxilla; More reference expression data
BioGPS	More reference expression data
Gene ontology
Molecular function	co-receptor binding; signal transducer activity; low-density lipoprotein particle receptor binding; protein binding; growth factor activity; receptor antagonist activity
Cellular component	early endosome membrane; plasma membrane; extracellular region; extracellular space
Biological process	hair follicle development; Wnt signaling pathway involved in somitogenesis; endoderm development; head morphogenesis; response to retinoic acid; negative regulation of Wnt-Frizzled-LRP5/6 complex assembly; positive regulation of heart induction by negative regulation of canonical Wnt signaling pathway; negative regulation of mesodermal cell fate specification; negative regulation of canonical Wnt signaling pathway involved in cardiac muscle cell fate commitment; negative regulation of Wnt signaling pathway; mesoderm formation; negative regulation of transcription by RNA polymerase II; Wnt signaling pathway; negative regulation of protein binding; negative regulation of pathway-restricted SMAD protein phosphorylation; negative regulation of BMP signaling pathway; multicellular organism development; motor learning; regulation of Wnt signaling pathway; embryonic limb morphogenesis; negative regulation of skeletal muscle tissue development; negative regulation of cardiac muscle cell differentiation; negative regulation of peptidyl-serine phosphorylation; regulation of receptor internalization; forebrain development; cell morphogenesis involved in differentiation; endoderm formation; regulation of synaptic transmission, glutamatergic; regulation of endodermal cell fate specification; regulation of synapse organization; negative regulation of canonical Wnt signaling pathway; face morphogenesis; synapse pruning; extracellular negative regulation of signal transduction; regulation of dopaminergic neuron differentiation; positive regulation of midbrain dopaminergic neuron differentiation; negative regulation of ossification; negative regulation of apoptotic process; limb development; learning or memory; regulation of signaling receptor activity; positive regulation of gene expression; positive regulation of cell death; positive regulation of JUN kinase activity; positive regulation of Wnt signaling pathway, calcium modulating pathway; positive regulation of neuron death; positive regulation of tau-protein kinase activity; positive regulation of Wnt signaling pathway, planar cell polarity pathway; negative regulation of neuron projection development; negative regulation of presynapse assembly; negative regulation of signaling receptor activity
Sources:Amigo / QuickGO
Orthologs
Databases	NCBI: entry; OMA: entry
Species	Human	Mouse
Entrez	22943	13380
Ensembl	ENSG00000107984	ENSMUSG00000024868
UniProt	O94907	O54908
RefSeq (mRNA)	NM_012242	NM_010051
RefSeq (protein)	NP_036374	NP_034181
Location (UCSC)	Chr 10: 52.31 – 52.32 Mb	Chr 19: 30.52 – 30.53 Mb
PubMed search
- Wikidata
View/Edit Human	View/Edit Mouse

Dickkopf-related protein 1 is a protein that in humans is encoded by the DKK1 gene.

== Function ==
This gene encodes a protein that is a member of the dickkopf family. It is a secreted protein with two cysteine rich regions and is involved in embryonic development through its inhibition of the Wnt signaling pathway. Dickkopf WNT signaling pathway inhibitor 1 (Dkk1) is a protein-coding gene that acts from the anterior visceral endoderm. The dickkopf protein encoded by DKK1 is an antagonist of the Wnt/β-catenin signalling pathway that acts by isolating the LRP6 co-receptor so that it cannot aid in activating the WNT signaling pathway. This inhibition plays a key role in heart, head and forelimb development during anterior morphogenesis of the embryo.

== Interactions ==
DKK1 has been shown to interact with LRP6 and is a high affinity ligand of Kremen proteins.

== Clinical significance ==
Elevated levels of DKK1 in bone marrow, plasma and peripheral blood are associated with the presence of osteolytic bone lesions in patients with multiple myeloma. Due to the role of DKK1 in inflammation induced bone loss DKK1 is under investigation as target for therapeutic strategies in medicine and dentistry.

== Animal studies ==
Scientists have created a DKK1 knockout model in mice that revealed the effects of this gene. All mice that were homozygous for the DKK1 knockout were dead at birth due to defects in the cranium and structures formed by the neural crest, such as failed development of eyes, olfactory placodes, frontonasal mass and mandibular processes, as well as incomplete development of the forebrain and midbrain and fusion of the digits of the forelimb. This evidence supports the idea that inhibition of the Wnt signaling pathway by DKK1 is crucial to proper cranial development.

== In vitro studies ==
DKK1 is one of the most upregulated genes in androgen-potentiated balding, with DKK-1 messenger RNA upregulated a few hours after DHT treatment of hair follicles at the dermal papilla in vitro. Neutralizing antibody against DKK-1 reversed DHT effects on outer root sheath keratinocytes. DKK-1 expression is attenuated by L-threonate in vitro, with the latter a metabolite of ascorbate.

== DKK1 and Alzheimer's ==
Alzheimer's disease occurs due to the overproduction of amyloid beta that will cluster together to form amyloid plaques between neurons in the brain and disrupt cell function. In addition, there is an accumulation of neurofibrillary tangles of hyperphosphorylated tau inside the neuron. The Wnt signaling pathway is crucial for brain development processes, which include neuron proliferation and differentiation as well as neuroblast migration and axon guidance. Downregulation of this signaling has been shown in those with Alzheimer's as a result of high levels of DKK1. Because of the hyperphosphorylation induced by DKK1, tau cannot interact with neuronal microtubules consequently compromising axonal transport resulting in synaptic loss and neuronal apoptosis. Because of its antagonistic effects on the Wnt signaling pathway, it is believed that DKK1 is a common marker for neuronal death in neurodegenerative diseases like Alzheimer's.
