= LRP6 =

Protein-coding gene in the species Homo sapiens

Identifiers
- Aliases: LRP6, ADCAD2, STHAG7, LDL receptor related protein 6
- External IDs: OMIM: 603507; MGI: 1298218; GeneCards: LRP6
Available structures
PDB	Ortholog search: PDBe RCSB
PDB	List of PDB id codes 3S2K, 3S8V, 3S8Z, 3S94, 3SOB, 3SOQ, 3SOV, 4A0P, 4DG6, 4NM5, 4NM7

Gene location (Human)
Chr.	Chromosome 12 (human)
Band	12p13.2	Start	12,116,025 bp
Band	12p13.2	End	12,267,044 bp

Gene location (Mouse)
Chr.	Chromosome 6 (mouse)
Band	6 G1|6 65.37 cM	Start	134,423,439 bp
Band	6 G1|6 65.37 cM	End	134,543,928 bp
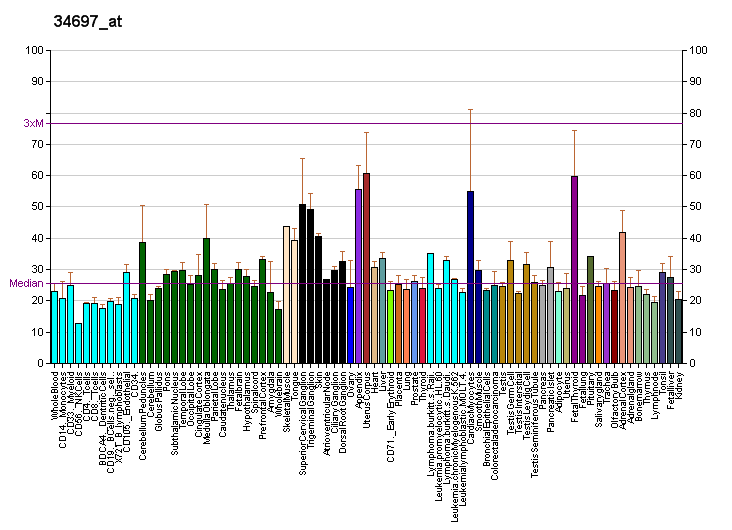

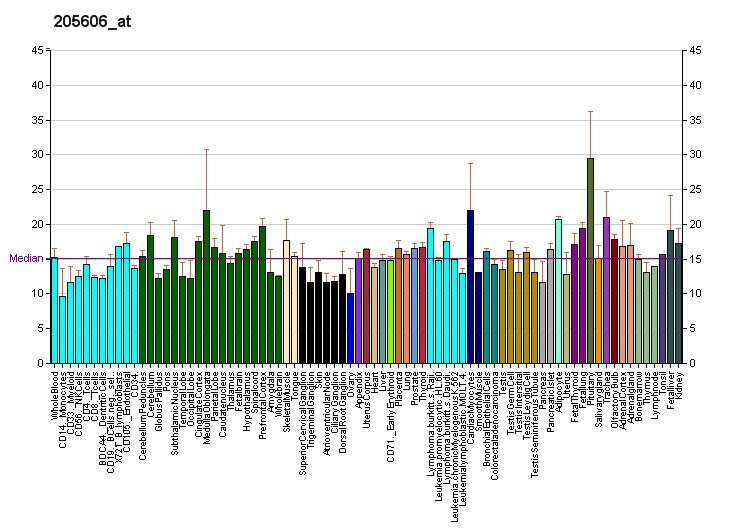
RNA expression pattern
Bgee	Human / Mouse (ortholog); Top expressed in: Achilles tendon; corpus callosum; ventricular zone; gonad; liver; stromal cell of endometrium; ganglionic eminence; epithelium of colon; placenta; sural nerve / Top expressed in: ascending aorta; aortic valve; stroma of bone marrow; cumulus cell; choroid plexus of fourth ventricle; lactiferous gland; secondary oocyte; extraocular muscle; zygote; Gonadal ridge; More reference expression data
BioGPS	More reference expression data
Gene ontology
Molecular function	low-density lipoprotein particle receptor activity; apolipoprotein binding; protein homodimerization activity; kinase inhibitor activity; frizzled binding; Wnt-protein binding; toxin transmembrane transporter activity; protein binding; coreceptor activity involved in Wnt signaling pathway; identical protein binding; Wnt-activated receptor activity; signaling receptor binding; coreceptor activity involved in canonical Wnt signaling pathway
Cellular component	integral component of membrane; Wnt-Frizzled-LRP5/6 complex; Wnt signalosome; Golgi apparatus; early endosome membrane; membrane; receptor complex; synapse; extracellular region; cell surface; soma; early endosome; endoplasmic reticulum; caveola; cytoplasmic vesicle; plasma membrane; membrane raft
Biological process	negative regulation of protein phosphorylation; Wnt signaling pathway involved in somitogenesis; cerebellum morphogenesis; roof of mouth development; dopaminergic neuron differentiation; positive regulation of Wnt signaling pathway involved in dorsal/ventral axis specification; regulation of transcription, DNA-templated; endocytosis; receptor-mediated endocytosis involved in cholesterol transport; embryonic pattern specification; convergent extension; negative regulation of protein kinase activity; thalamus development; axis elongation involved in somitogenesis; canonical Wnt signaling pathway involved in neural crest cell differentiation; positive regulation of cytosolic calcium ion concentration; response to peptide hormone; canonical Wnt signaling pathway involved in regulation of cell proliferation; neural crest cell differentiation; positive regulation of DNA-binding transcription factor activity; Wnt signaling pathway; cellular response to cholesterol; neural crest formation; trachea cartilage morphogenesis; positive regulation of transcription, DNA-templated; odontogenesis of dentin-containing tooth; multicellular organism development; midbrain-hindbrain boundary development; neural tube closure; positive regulation of cell cycle; external genitalia morphogenesis; Wnt signaling pathway involved in dorsal/ventral axis specification; pericardium morphogenesis; cerebral cortex development; embryonic retina morphogenesis in camera-type eye; canonical Wnt signaling pathway; negative regulation of protein serine/threonine kinase activity; protein localization to plasma membrane; negative regulation of canonical Wnt signaling pathway; negative regulation of smooth muscle cell apoptotic process; face morphogenesis; primitive streak formation; positive regulation of transcription by RNA polymerase II; chemical synaptic transmission; toxin transport; Wnt signaling pathway involved in midbrain dopaminergic neuron differentiation; positive regulation of canonical Wnt signaling pathway; beta-catenin destruction complex disassembly; midbrain dopaminergic neuron differentiation; gastrulation with mouth forming second; anterior/posterior pattern specification; embryonic limb morphogenesis; midbrain development; bone remodeling; embryonic camera-type eye morphogenesis; bone morphogenesis; branching involved in mammary gland duct morphogenesis; cell-cell adhesion
Sources:Amigo / QuickGO
Orthologs
Databases	NCBI: entry; OMA: entry
Species	Human	Mouse
Entrez	4040	16974
Ensembl	ENSG00000070018; ENSG00000281324	ENSMUSG00000030201
UniProt	O75581	O88572
RefSeq (mRNA)	NM_002336	NM_008514
RefSeq (protein)	NP_002327	NP_032540
Location (UCSC)	Chr 12: 12.12 – 12.27 Mb	Chr 6: 134.42 – 134.54 Mb
PubMed search
- Wikidata
View/Edit Human	View/Edit Mouse

Low-density lipoprotein receptor-related protein 6 is a protein that in humans is encoded by the LRP6 gene. LRP6 is a key component of the LRP5/LRP6/Frizzled co-receptor group that is involved in canonical Wnt pathway.

== Structure ==
LRP6 is a transmembrane low-density lipoprotein receptor that shares a similar structure with LRP5. In each protein, about 85% of its 1600-amino-acid length is extracellular. Each has four YWTD β-propeller motifs at the amino terminal end that alternate with four epidermal growth factor (EGF)-like repeats, followed by three LDLR type A repeats. Most extracellular ligands bind to LRP5 and LRP6 at the β-propellers. Each protein has a single-pass, 22-amino-acid transmembrane helix followed by a 207-amino-acid segment that is internal to the cell.

== Function ==
LRP6 acts as a co-receptor with LRP5 and the Frizzled protein family members for transducing signals by Wnt proteins through the canonical Wnt pathway.

A LRP6 mutant lacking the intracellular domain is defective in Wnt signaling while LRP6 mutant lacking the extracellular domain (but anchored on the membrane) are constitutively active.

== Interactions ==
Canonical WNT signals are transduced through Frizzled receptor and LRP5/LRP6 coreceptor to downregulate GSK3beta (GSK3B) activity not depending on Ser-9 phosphorylation. Reduction of canonical Wnt signals upon depletion of LRP5 and LRP6 results in p120-catenin degradation.

LRP6 is regulated by extracellular proteins in the Dickkopf (Dkk) family (like DKK1), sclerostin, R-spondins and members of the cysteine-knot-type protein family.

== Clinical significance ==
Common genetic variants of LRP6 have been associated with the risks for hyperlipidemia, atherosclerosis, coronary disease, and late-onset Alzheimer's disease in the general population.

Loss-of-function mutations or LRP6 in humans lead to increased plasma LDL and triglycerides, hypertension, diabetes and osteoporosis. Similarly, mice with a loss-of-function Lrp6 mutation have low bone mass. LRP6 is critical in bone's anabolic response to parathyroid hormone (PTH) treatment, whereas LRP5 is not involved. On the other hand, LRP6 does not appear active in mechanotransduction (bone's response to forces), while LRP5 is critical in that role. Sclerostin, one of the inhibitors of LRP6, is a promising osteocyte-specific Wnt antagonist in osteoporosis clinical trials.
