= LRP5 =

Protein-coding gene in the species Homo sapiens

Identifiers
- Aliases: LRP5, BMND1, EVR1, EVR4, HBM, LR3, LRP-5, LRP7, OPPG, OPS, OPTA1, VBCH2, LDL receptor related protein 5, PCLD4, LRP-7
- External IDs: OMIM: 603506; MGI: 1278315; GeneCards: LRP5

Gene location (Human)
Chr.	Chromosome 11 (human)
Band	11q13.2	Start	68,312,591 bp
Band	11q13.2	End	68,449,275 bp

Gene location (Mouse)
Chr.	Chromosome 19 (mouse)
Band	19|19 A	Start	3,634,828 bp
Band	19|19 A	End	3,736,564 bp
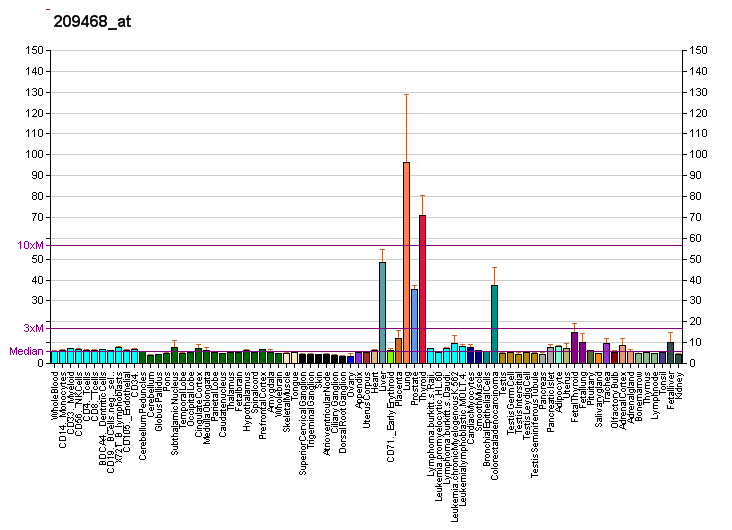
RNA expression pattern
Bgee	Human / Mouse (ortholog); Top expressed in: right lobe of liver; mucosa of transverse colon; ascending aorta; apex of heart; minor salivary glands; Descending thoracic aorta; popliteal artery; tibial arteries; olfactory zone of nasal mucosa; right coronary artery / Top expressed in: epithelium of urethra; male urethra; yolk sac; epithelium of male urethra; female urethra; epithelium of female urethra; muscle layer of urethra; lip; spermatid; genital tubercle; More reference expression data
BioGPS	More reference expression data
Gene ontology
Molecular function	toxin transmembrane transporter activity; protein binding; coreceptor activity involved in Wnt signaling pathway; Wnt-activated receptor activity; coreceptor activity involved in canonical Wnt signaling pathway; Wnt-protein binding
Cellular component	integral component of membrane; Wnt signalosome; Wnt-Frizzled-LRP5/6 complex; membrane; receptor complex; plasma membrane; endoplasmic reticulum; mitochondrion
Biological process	regulation of apoptotic process; positive regulation of osteoblast proliferation; regulation of insulin secretion involved in cellular response to glucose stimulus; endocytosis; limb morphogenesis; extracellular matrix-cell signaling; branching involved in mammary gland duct morphogenesis; somatic stem cell population maintenance; bone marrow development; regulation of canonical Wnt signaling pathway; bone morphogenesis; gastrulation with mouth forming second; embryonic digit morphogenesis; positive regulation of DNA-binding transcription factor activity; cell-cell signaling involved in mammary gland development; cholesterol metabolic process; Wnt signaling pathway; negative regulation of osteoblast differentiation; anatomical structure regression; mammary gland duct morphogenesis; regulation of blood pressure; positive regulation of transcription, DNA-templated; multicellular organism development; retina morphogenesis in camera-type eye; vasculature development; apoptotic process involved in blood vessel morphogenesis; positive regulation of mesenchymal cell proliferation; bone remodeling; Wnt signaling pathway involved in dorsal/ventral axis specification; glucose catabolic process; positive regulation of cell population proliferation; retinal blood vessel morphogenesis; canonical Wnt signaling pathway; osteoblast development; negative regulation of protein serine/threonine kinase activity; adipose tissue development; cell migration involved in gastrulation; cholesterol homeostasis; bone development; positive regulation of fat cell differentiation; positive regulation of mitotic nuclear division; retina vasculature morphogenesis in camera-type eye; anterior/posterior pattern specification; positive regulation of transcription by RNA polymerase II; regulation of bone remodeling; beta-catenin destruction complex disassembly; response to peptide hormone; positive regulation of osteoblast differentiation; toxin transport; Norrin signaling pathway
Sources:Amigo / QuickGO
Orthologs
Databases	NCBI: entry; OMA: entry
Species	Human	Mouse
Entrez	4041	16973
Ensembl	ENSG00000162337	ENSMUSG00000024913
UniProt	O75197	Q91VN0
RefSeq (mRNA)	NM_001291902; NM_002335	NM_008513
RefSeq (protein)	NP_001278831; NP_002326	NP_032539
Location (UCSC)	Chr 11: 68.31 – 68.45 Mb	Chr 19: 3.63 – 3.74 Mb
PubMed search
- Wikidata
View/Edit Human	View/Edit Mouse

Low-density lipoprotein receptor-related protein 5 is a protein that in humans is encoded by the LRP5 gene. LRP5 is a key component of the LRP5/LRP6/Frizzled co-receptor group that is involved in canonical Wnt pathway. Mutations in LRP5 can lead to considerable changes in bone mass. A loss-of-function mutation causes osteoporosis pseudoglioma syndrome with a decrease in bone mass, while a gain-of-function mutation causes drastic increases in bone mass.

== Structure ==
LRP5 is a transmembrane low-density lipoprotein receptor that shares a similar structure with LRP6. In each protein, about 85% of its 1600-amino-acid length is extracellular. Each has four β-propeller motifs at the amino terminal end that alternate with four epidermal growth factor (EGF)-like repeats. Most extracellular ligands bind to LRP5 and LRP6 at the β-propellers. Each protein has a single-pass, 22-amino-acid segment that crosses the cell membrane and a 207-amino-acid segment that is internal to the cell.

== Function ==
LRP5 acts as a co-receptor with LRP6 and the Frizzled protein family members for transducing signals by Wnt proteins through the canonical Wnt pathway. This protein plays a key role in skeletal homeostasis.

== Transcription ==
The LRP5 promoter contains binding sites for KLF15 and SP1. In addition, 5' region of the LRP5 gene contains four RUNX2 binding sites. LRP5 has been shown in mice and humans to inhibit expression of TPH1, the rate-limiting biosynthetic enzyme for serotonin in enterochromaffin cells of the duodenum and that excess plasma serotonin leads to inhibition in bone. On the other hand, one study in mouse has shown a direct effect of Lrp5 on bone.

== Interactions ==
LRP5 has been shown to interact with AXIN1.

Canonical WNT signals are transduced through Frizzled receptor and LRP5/LRP6 coreceptor to downregulate GSK3beta (GSK3B) activity not depending on Ser-9 phosphorylation. Reduction of canonical Wnt signals upon depletion of LRP5 and LRP6 results in p120-catenin degradation.

== Clinical significance ==
The Wnt signaling pathway was first linked to bone development when a loss-of-function mutation in LRP5 was found to cause osteoporosis-pseudoglioma syndrome. Shortly thereafter, two studies reported that gain-of-function mutations in LRP5 caused high bone mass. Many bone density related diseases are caused by mutations in the LRP5 gene. There is controversy whether bone grows through Lrp5 through bone or the intestine. The majority of the current data supports the concept that bone mass is controlled by LRP5 through the osteocytes. Mice with the same Lrp5 gain-of-function mutations also have high bone mass. The high bone mass is maintained when the mutation only occurs in limbs or in cells of the osteoblastic lineage. Bone mechanotransduction occurs through Lrp5 and is suppressed if Lrp5 is removed in only osteocytes. There are promising osteoporosis clinical trials targeting sclerostin, an osteocyte-specific protein which inhibits Wnt signaling by binding to Lrp5. An alternative model that has been verified in mice and in humans is that Lrp5 controls bone formation by inhibiting expression of TPH1, the rate-limiting biosynthetic enzyme for serotonin, a molecule that regulates bone formation, in enterochromaffin cells of the duodenum and that excess plasma serotonin leads to inhibition in bone. Another study found that a different Tph1-inhibitor decreased serotonin levels in the blood and intestine, but did not affect bone mass or markers of bone formation.

LRP5 may be essential for the development of retinal vasculature, and may play a role in capillary maturation. Mutations in this gene also cause familial exudative vitreoretinopathy.

A glial-derived extracellular ligand, Norrin, acts on a transmembrane receptor, Frizzled4, a coreceptor, Lrp5, and an auxiliary membrane protein, TSPAN12, on the surface of developing endothelial cells to control a transcriptional program that regulates endothelial growth and maturation.

LRP5 knockout in mice led to increased plasma cholesterol levels on a high-fat diet because of the decreased hepatic clearance of chylomicron remnants. When fed a normal diet, LRP5-deficient mice showed a markedly impaired glucose tolerance with marked reduction in intracellular ATP and Ca^{2+} in response to glucose, and impairment in glucose-induced insulin secretion. IP3 production in response to glucose was also reduced in LRP5—islets possibly caused by a marked reduction of various transcripts for genes involved in glucose sensing in LRP5—islets. LRP5-deficient islets lacked the Wnt-3a-stimulated insulin secretion. These data suggest that WntLRP5 signaling contributes to the glucose-induced insulin secretion in the islets.

In osteoarthritic chondrocytes the Wnt/beta-catenin pathway is activated with a significant up-regulation of beta-catenin mRNA expression. LRP5 mRNA and protein expression are also significantly up-regulated in osteoarthritic cartilage compared to normal cartilage, and LRP5 mRNA expression was further increased by vitamin D. Blocking LRP5 expression using siRNA against LRP5 resulted in a significant decrease in MMP13 mRNA and protein expressions. The catabolic role of LRP5 appears to be mediated by the Wnt/beta-catenin pathway in human osteoarthritis.

The polyphenol curcumin increases the mRNA expression of LRP5.

Mutations in LRP5 cause polycystic liver disease, and it has also been linked to conditions such as tubulointerstitial fibrosis, polycystic kidney disease, and atherosclerosis.
