= PLXND1 =

Protein-coding gene in the species Homo sapiens

Identifiers
- Aliases: PLXND1, PLEXD1, plexin D1
- External IDs: OMIM: 604282; MGI: 2154244; GeneCards: PLXND1
Available structures
PDB	Ortholog search: PDBe RCSB
PDB	List of PDB id codes 3H6N

Gene location (Human)
Chr.	Chromosome 3 (human)
Band	3q22.1	Start	129,555,214 bp
Band	3q22.1	End	129,606,676 bp

Gene location (Mouse)
Chr.	Chromosome 6 (mouse)
Band	6|6 E3	Start	115,931,772 bp
Band	6|6 E3	End	115,971,966 bp
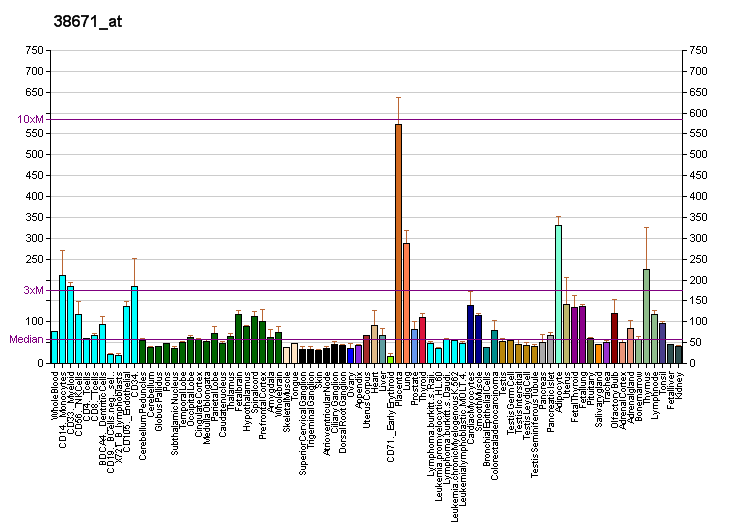

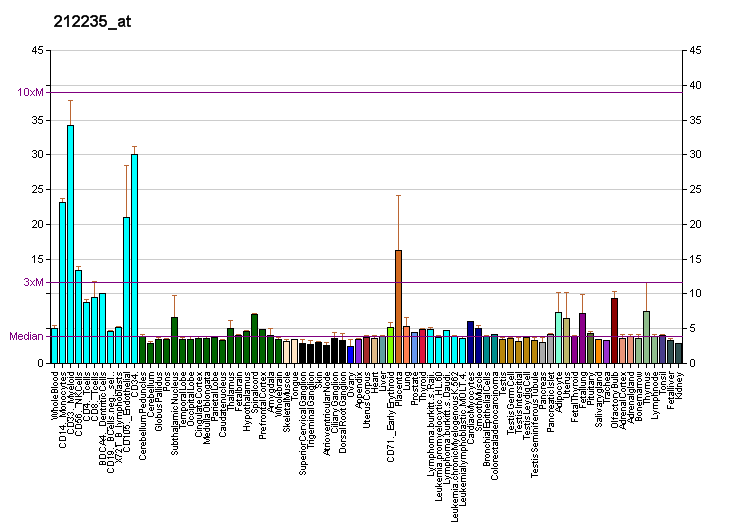
RNA expression pattern
Bgee	Human / Mouse (ortholog); Top expressed in: upper lobe of left lung; right coronary artery; right lung; tibial nerve; canal of the cervix; apex of heart; body of uterus; left uterine tube; gallbladder; left coronary artery / Top expressed in: thymus; external carotid artery; ankle joint; molar; lumbar spinal ganglion; internal carotid artery; yolk sac; atrium; genital tubercle; decidua; More reference expression data
BioGPS	More reference expression data
Gene ontology
Molecular function	protein domain specific binding; protein binding; semaphorin receptor activity
Cellular component	integral component of membrane; membrane; plasma membrane; lamellipodium; integral component of plasma membrane; lamellipodium membrane; cell projection; semaphorin receptor complex
Biological process	cardiac septum development; outflow tract morphogenesis; regulation of angiogenesis; coronary vasculature development; multicellular organism development; aorta development; angiogenesis; dichotomous subdivision of terminal units involved in salivary gland branching; branching involved in blood vessel morphogenesis; synapse assembly; positive regulation of protein binding; endothelial cell migration; semaphorin-plexin signaling pathway; signal transduction; negative regulation of cell adhesion; regulation of cell shape; regulation of cell migration; positive regulation of axonogenesis; regulation of GTPase activity; positive regulation of transcription of Notch receptor target; semaphorin-plexin signaling pathway involved in axon guidance
Sources:Amigo / QuickGO
Orthologs
Databases	NCBI: entry; OMA: entry
Species	Human	Mouse
Entrez	23129	67784
Ensembl	ENSG00000004399	ENSMUSG00000030123
UniProt	Q9Y4D7	Q3UH93
RefSeq (mRNA)	NM_015103	NM_026376
RefSeq (protein)	NP_055918	NP_080652
Location (UCSC)	Chr 3: 129.56 – 129.61 Mb	Chr 6: 115.93 – 115.97 Mb
PubMed search
- Wikidata
View/Edit Human	View/Edit Mouse

Plexin-D1 is a protein that in humans is encoded by the PLXND1 gene.
