= Frizzled-4 =

Protein-coding gene in the species Homo sapiens

FZD4

Identifiers
- Aliases: FZD4, CD344, EVR1, FEVR, FZD4S, Fz-4, Fz4, FzE4, GPCR, hFz4, frizzled class receptor 4
- External IDs: OMIM: 604579; MGI: 108520; GeneCards: FZD4
Available structures
PDB	Ortholog search: PDBe RCSB
PDB	List of PDB id codes 5BPB, 5BPQ, 5BQC, 5BQE, 5CL1, 5CM4

Gene location (Human)
Chr.	Chromosome 11 (human)
Band	11q14.2	Start	86,945,679 bp
Band	11q14.2	End	86,955,395 bp

Gene location (Mouse)
Chr.	Chromosome 7 (mouse)
Band	7 D3|7 49.32 cM	Start	89,053,563 bp
Band	7 D3|7 49.32 cM	End	89,062,342 bp
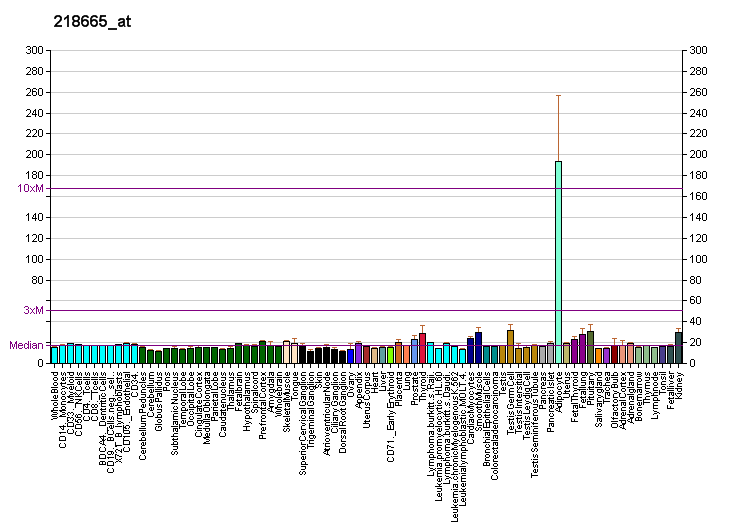
RNA expression pattern
Bgee	Human / Mouse (ortholog); Top expressed in: adipose tissue; subcutaneous adipose tissue; right lung; abdominal fat; parietal pleura; synovial joint; tendon of biceps brachii; pericardium; seminal vesicula; thoracic diaphragm / Top expressed in: retinal pigment epithelium; choroid plexus of fourth ventricle; ciliary body; internal carotid artery; Epithelium of choroid plexus; epithelium of stomach; ankle; subcutaneous adipose tissue; white adipose tissue; external carotid artery; More reference expression data
BioGPS	More reference expression data
Gene ontology
Molecular function	PDZ domain binding; protein homodimerization activity; signal transducer activity; protein binding; protein heterodimerization activity; Wnt-activated receptor activity; ubiquitin protein ligase binding; transmembrane signaling receptor activity; cytokine binding; G protein-coupled receptor activity; Wnt-protein binding; amyloid-beta binding; signaling receptor activity; protein-containing complex binding
Cellular component	clathrin-coated endocytic vesicle membrane; membrane; cell-cell junction; plasma membrane; integral component of plasma membrane; cell surface; extracellular exosome; integral component of membrane; clathrin-coated vesicle membrane; dendrite; synapse; glutamatergic synapse
Biological process	negative regulation of cell-substrate adhesion; cellular response to retinoic acid; G protein-coupled receptor signaling pathway; luteinization; extracellular matrix-cell signaling; positive regulation of JUN kinase activity; positive regulation of DNA-binding transcription factor activity; hearing; Wnt signaling pathway; regulation of vascular endothelial growth factor receptor signaling pathway; vasculogenesis; positive regulation of transcription, DNA-templated; multicellular organism development; cerebellum vasculature morphogenesis; cell surface receptor signaling pathway; progesterone secretion; blood vessel development; neuron differentiation; retinal blood vessel morphogenesis; canonical Wnt signaling pathway; substrate adhesion-dependent cell spreading; locomotion involved in locomotory behavior; retina vasculature morphogenesis in camera-type eye; signal transduction; Wnt signaling pathway, calcium modulating pathway; Wnt signaling pathway, planar cell polarity pathway; membrane organization; non-canonical Wnt signaling pathway; positive regulation of neuron projection arborization; cellular response to leukemia inhibitory factor
Sources:Amigo / QuickGO
Orthologs
Databases	NCBI: entry; OMA: entry
Species	Human	Mouse
Entrez	8322	14366
Ensembl	ENSG00000174804	ENSMUSG00000049791
UniProt	Q9ULV1	Q61088
RefSeq (mRNA)	NM_012193	NM_008055
RefSeq (protein)	NP_036325	NP_032081
Location (UCSC)	Chr 11: 86.95 – 86.96 Mb	Chr 7: 89.05 – 89.06 Mb
PubMed search
- Wikidata
View/Edit Human	View/Edit Mouse

Frizzled-4 (Fz-4) is a protein that in humans is encoded by the FZD4 gene. Fz-4 has also been designated as CD344 (cluster of differentiation 344).

== Function ==
This gene is a member of the frizzled gene family. Members of this family encode seven-transmembrane domain proteins that are receptors for the Wingless type MMTV integration site family of signaling proteins. Frizzled-4 is the only representative of frizzled family members that binds strongly an additional ligand Norrin that is functionally similar but structurally different from Wingless type proteins. FZD4 signaling induced by Norrin regulates vascular development of vertebrate retina and controls important blood vessels in the ear. Most frizzled receptors are coupled to the beta-catenin canonical signaling pathway. This protein may play a role as a positive regulator of the Wingless type MMTV integration site signaling pathway. A transcript variant retaining intronic sequence and encoding a shorter isoform has been described, however, its expression is not supported by other experimental evidence.

== See also ==
- Frizzled
