= Naked cuticle 1 =

Protein-coding gene in the species Homo sapiens

NKD1

Identifiers
- Aliases: NKD1, Naked1, Naked cuticle 1, naked cuticle homolog 1, WNT signaling pathway inhibitor, NKD inhibitor of WNT signaling pathway 1
- External IDs: OMIM: 607851; MGI: 2135954; GeneCards: NKD1

Gene location (Human)
Chr.	Chromosome 16 (human)
Band	16q12.1	Start	50,548,396 bp
Band	16q12.1	End	50,649,249 bp

Gene location (Mouse)
Chr.	Chromosome 8 (mouse)
Band	8|8 C3	Start	89,247,982 bp
Band	8|8 C3	End	89,321,512 bp
RNA expression pattern
Bgee	Human / Mouse (ortholog); Top expressed in: right lung; saphenous vein; lateral nuclear group of thalamus; popliteal artery; tibial arteries; endothelial cell; sural nerve; lower lobe of lung; Descending thoracic aorta; ascending aorta / Top expressed in: zygote; secondary oocyte; gastrula; tail of embryo; primary oocyte; left lung lobe; Rostral migratory stream; seminal vesicula; lumbar subsegment of spinal cord; genital tubercle; More reference expression data
BioGPS	n/a
Gene ontology
Molecular function	calcium ion binding; PDZ domain binding; protein binding; metal ion binding
Cellular component	cytoplasm; plasma membrane; protein phosphatase type 2A complex; membrane
Biological process	negative regulation of Wnt signaling pathway; positive regulation of Wnt signaling pathway, planar cell polarity pathway; positive regulation of non-canonical Wnt signaling pathway via JNK cascade; somatic muscle development; eye photoreceptor cell differentiation; Wnt signaling pathway; positive regulation of protein catabolic process; negative regulation of canonical Wnt signaling pathway; regulation of cell migration involved in somitogenic axis elongation; negative regulation of convergent extension involved in axis elongation
Sources:Amigo / QuickGO
Orthologs
Databases	NCBI: entry; OMA: entry
Species	Human	Mouse
Entrez	85407	93960
Ensembl	ENSG00000140807	ENSMUSG00000031661
UniProt	Q969G9	Q99MH6
RefSeq (mRNA)	NM_033119	NM_001163660; NM_027280
RefSeq (protein)	NP_149110	NP_001157132; NP_081556
Location (UCSC)	Chr 16: 50.55 – 50.65 Mb	Chr 8: 89.25 – 89.32 Mb
PubMed search
- Wikidata
View/Edit Human	View/Edit Mouse

Naked cuticle homolog 1 (Naked-1) is a protein which in humans is encoded by the gene NKD1. Naked-1 is a member of the Naked cuticle (Nkd) family of proteins that regulate the Wnt signaling pathway. Nkd1 binds to the Dishevelled (Dvl) family of proteins (DVL1, DVL2, DVL3).

== Species distribution ==
Insects typically have a single Nkd gene, whereas there are two Nkd genes, Nkd1 and Nkd2, in most vertebrates studied to date (zebrafish appear to have additional homologous genes such as Nkd3).

== Clinical significance ==
Specific truncating NKD1 mutations identified in DNA mismatch repair deficient colon cancer that disrupt Nkd1/Dvl binding implicate these mutations as a cause of increased Wnt signaling in a subset of human colon cancers, the majority of which have increased Wnt signaling due to mutations the adenomatous polyposis coli (APC), AXIN2, or rarely the beta-catenin genes.
