= Naked cuticle 2 =

Protein-coding gene in the species Homo sapiens

NKD2

Identifiers
- Aliases: NKD2, Naked2, Naked cuticle 2, naked cuticle homolog 2, WNT signaling pathway inhibitor, NKD inhibitor of WNT signaling pathway 2
- External IDs: OMIM: 607852; MGI: 1919543; GeneCards: NKD2

Gene location (Human)
Chr.	Chromosome 5 (human)
Band	5p15.33	Start	1,008,802 bp
Band	5p15.33	End	1,038,943 bp

Gene location (Mouse)
Chr.	Chromosome 13 (mouse)
Band	13|13 C1	Start	73,966,653 bp
Band	13|13 C1	End	73,995,750 bp
RNA expression pattern
Bgee	Human / Mouse (ortholog); Top expressed in: upper lobe of left lung; right lung; spleen; skin of abdomen; skin of leg; left adrenal cortex; right testis; left testis; right adrenal gland; placenta / Top expressed in: tail of embryo; genital tubercle; hand; hair follicle; foot; maxillary prominence; paraxial mesoderm; mandibular prominence; iris; lip; More reference expression data
BioGPS	n/a
Gene ontology
Molecular function	calcium ion binding; growth factor binding; metal ion binding; protein binding; ubiquitin protein ligase binding; myosin heavy chain binding; ATPase binding
Cellular component	cytoplasm; lateral plasma membrane; membrane; basolateral plasma membrane; cytoplasmic vesicle; cell periphery; plasma membrane; exocytic vesicle
Biological process	Wnt signaling pathway; positive regulation of protein processing; Golgi vesicle fusion to target membrane; negative regulation of canonical Wnt signaling pathway; positive regulation of proteasomal ubiquitin-dependent protein catabolic process; exocytosis; protein localization to plasma membrane; positive regulation of protein localization to plasma membrane; negative regulation of Wnt signaling pathway
Sources:Amigo / QuickGO
Orthologs
Databases	NCBI: entry; OMA: entry
Species	Human	Mouse
Entrez	85409	72293
Ensembl	ENSG00000145506; ENSG00000276920	ENSMUSG00000021567
UniProt	Q969F2	Q8VE28
RefSeq (mRNA)	NM_001271082; NM_033120	NM_028186; NM_001347535
RefSeq (protein)	NP_001258011; NP_149111	NP_001334464; NP_082462
Location (UCSC)	Chr 5: 1.01 – 1.04 Mb	Chr 13: 73.97 – 74 Mb
PubMed search
- Wikidata
View/Edit Human	View/Edit Mouse

Naked cuticle homolog 2 (Naked-2) is a protein which in humans is encoded by the gene NKD2. Naked-2 is one of the Naked cuticle (Nkd) family of proteins that regulate the Wnt signaling pathway. Both naked-1 and naked-2 proteins can bind to Dishevelled proteins (DVL1, DVL2, DVL3), but only naked-2 can bind to the EGF-ligand family member TGF alpha and regulate its polarized secretion in cultured epithelial cells.
