= PTD =

PTD may refer to:

== Law ==
- Permanent total disability, in insurance law
- Pre-trial diversion, in criminal justice
- Protected trust deed, in Scottish bankruptcy law

== Science, technology and mathematics ==
- Pathfinder Technology Demonstrator, ongoing NASA missions to test miniaturized satellites
- Peak–trough difference, of an oscillating curve
- Poloidal–toroidal decomposition, in vector calculus
- Pre-term delivery, a human birth under 37 weeks gestation
- PTD-DBM, a synthetic peptide to reverse hair loss
- Pre-Thread Data file, in Microsoft's .NET Framework

== Other uses ==
- Administrative and Diplomatic Officer, a specific group of civil servants who play a crucial role in the Malaysian public service
- Participatory technology development, in international agriculture programs
- Partido de los Trabajadores Dominicanos or the Dominican Workers' Party
- Potsdam Municipal Airport, New York, US (FAA LID:PTD)
- Post travel depression, a mood disorder
- Prevention through design, in occupational health and safety
