= Kang-Yell Choi =

South Korean biotechnologist

Kang-Yell Choi is a South Korean professor of biotechnology at Yonsei University and chief executive officer of CK Regeon Inc. in Seoul. His research focuses on cellular signaling, particularly the Wnt/β-catenin pathway and its role in various physiological and pathological processes. For a decade, he directed the Translational Research Center for Protein Function Control (TRCP), a government-funded institute for drug development. His work has explored ways to regulate the Wnt/β-catenin signaling pathway and the involvement of CXXC5 in conditions that impair tissue regeneration.

== Education ==
Choi earned his Ph.D. in biochemistry from Purdue University in 1993. During his doctoral studies, he researched the Escherichia coli purine repressor (PurR), contributing to understanding the structure of the lactose repressor protein (LacI), a key focus in molecular biology at the time. Following his doctorate, he worked as a postdoctoral fellow at Harvard Medical School, where he studied cell signaling mechanisms. His research on the Saccharomyces protein Ste5, which mediates pheromone response through the MAP kinase pathway, was among the first to introduce the concept of a "scaffold protein."

== Career and research ==
In 1995, Kang-Yell Choi returned to South Korea and joined Yonsei University as a professor. He has served as chief of the National Research Laboratory for Molecular Complex Control and currently directs the Translational Research Center for Protein Function Control (TRCP), a program supported by the National Research Foundation of Korea and the Ministry of Science and ICT. He also founded CK Regeon Inc., a biotechnology company focused on developing therapies for conditions such as non-alcoholic steatohepatitis (NASH), hair loss, and diabetic wounds, which are associated with impaired Wnt/β-catenin signaling caused by CXXC5 overexpression.

=== Cancer ===
Choi’s work has examined the regulation of Ras stability through the Wnt/β-catenin signaling pathway. His research identified that degradation of Ras, particularly K-Ras, occurs via GSK3-mediated phosphorylation followed by ubiquitin-dependent proteasomal degradation through recruitment of the β-TrCP E3 ligase. He further showed that oncogenic K-Ras can be stabilized by the loss of APC, leading to reactivation of Wnt/β-catenin signaling and the promotion of cancer stem cell activity and liver metastasis in colorectal cancer. These findings highlighted the potential benefit of inhibiting both Wnt/β-catenin and Ras–ERK pathways in cancer therapy. Choi later identified small molecules that promote degradation of β-catenin and Ras, which were found to inhibit the growth of colorectal and other cancers with activated Wnt/β-catenin and EGFR–Ras signaling.

=== CXXC5 and PTD-DBM ===
Choi also identified CXXC5 as a negative feedback regulator of the Wnt/β-catenin pathway that interacts with Dishevelled (Dvl) in the cytoplasm. He found that CXXC5 is overexpressed in bald scalp tissue, diabetic wounds, and aged skin. His group developed PTD-DBM, a peptide that restores Wnt/β-catenin signaling by blocking the interaction between CXXC5 and Dvl. Topical application of PTD-DBM, particularly in combination with a Wnt/β-catenin activator such as valproic acid, was shown to promote hair growth and accelerate wound healing.

PTD-DBM was also observed to increase collagen production, support cell migration, and reduce reactive oxygen species and apoptosis in skin cells, indicating potential anti-aging effects. It has been used as a treatment agent for hair loss in various applications. Choi’s ongoing research includes the development of small molecules that mimic PTD-DBM activity through an in vitro screening system targeting the CXXC5–Dvl interaction, with several candidates showing promise for promoting hair regeneration, wound healing, and skin rejuvenation.

== Publications ==
- 5-FU promotes stemness ofcolorectal cancer via p53-mediated WNT/β-catenin pathway activation. Nature Communications. (2020)
- WDR76 is a RAS binding protein that functions as a tumor suppressor via RAS degradation. Nature Communications. (2019)
- β-Catenin-RAS interaction serves as molecular switch for RAS degradation via GSK3β. EMBO Reports. (2018)
- Targeting of CXXC5 by a Competing Peptide Stimulates Hair Regrowth and Wound-Induced Hair Neogenesis. Journal of Investigative Dermatology. (2017)
- Small molecule binding of the Axin-RGS domain promotes β-catenin and Ras degradation. Nature Chemical Biology. (2016)
- Small molecule inhibitors of Dishevelled-CXXC5 interaction are new drug candidates for bone anabolic osteoporosis therapy. EMBO Molecular Medicine. (2016)
- The Dishevelled-binding protein CXXC5 negatively regulates cutaneous wound healing. Journal of Experimental Medicine. (2015)
- CXXC5 is a negative-feedback regulator of the Wnt/β-catenin pathway involved in osteoblast differentiation. Cell Death and Differentiation. (2015)
- Oncogenic K-Ras Accelerates Cancer Stem Cell Activation via Aberrant Wnt/beta-catenin Signaling. JNCI-Journal of the National Cancer Institute. (2014)
- Ras Stabilization via Aberrant Activation of Wnt/b-catenin Signaling Promotes Intestinal Tumorigenesis. Science Signaling. (2012)
- MEK1/2 Inhibitors, AS703026 and AZD6244, may be potential therapies for K-ras Mutated Colorectal Cancer that Is resistant to EGFR Monoclonal Antibody Therapy. Cancer Research. (2011)
- Wnt5a Is Required for Endothelial Differentiation of Embryonic Stem Cells and Vascularization via Pathways Involving Both Wnt/β-Catenin and Protein Kinase Cα. Circulation Research. (2009)
- Ste5 thether multiple protein kinase in the MAP kinase cascade required for mating in Saccharomyces cerevisiae. Cell. (1994)
- Crystal structure of LacI member RurR, bound to DNA: Minor groove binding by α helices. Science. (1994)
