= Mir-187 microRNA precursor family =

mir-187

Identifiers
- Symbol: mir-187
- Rfam: RF00674
- miRBase family: 8

Other data
- RNA type: microRNA
- Domain(s): Eukaryota;
- PDB structures: PDBe

In molecular biology mir-187 microRNA is a short RNA molecule. MicroRNAs function to regulate the expression levels of other genes by several mechanisms.

miR-187 has been found to be expressed at higher levels in ovarian cancers compared with benign tumours. It is known to target DAB2 (disabled homolog-2), a protein encoded by the DAB2 gene, with miR-187's target site at the 3'UTR of the DAB2 gene. DAB2 has been seen to play roles in both cell proliferation and tumour progression, and initial expression of miR-187 in cancer cells promotes cell proliferation. However, overexpression suppresses DAB2 and inhibits epithelial to mesenchymal cell transition. High miR-187 levels have accordingly been associated with higher survival rates in ovarian cancer patients.

== See also ==
- MicroRNA
