= NKD =

NKD may refer to:

- Naked cuticle, a conserved family of intracellular proteins encoded in most animal genomes.
- NKD (retailer), a German clothing discount store chain headquartered in Bindlach, Germany.
