= Naked cuticle =

Protein family

Naked cuticle (Nkd) is a conserved family of intracellular proteins encoded in most animal genomes. The original mutants were discovered by 1995 Nobel laureates Christiane Nüsslein-Volhard and Eric F. Wieschaus and colleagues in their genetic screens for pattern-formation mutants in the fruit fly Drosophila melanogaster. The Nkd gene was cloned in the laboratory of Matthew P. Scott. Like many cleverly named fly mutants, the name "naked cuticle" derives from the fact that mutants lack most of the hair-like protrusions from their ventral cuticle and thus appear "naked".

In Drosophila, nkd is a segment–polarity class gene that limits the spatial extent of Wnt signaling pathway activity. Nkd acts in an analogous fashion to how the Patched (Ptc) gene regulates the Hedgehog signaling pathway; i.e., Nkd and Ptc shape tissue gradients of Wnt and Hedgehog signaling, respectively. Nkd was linked to Wnt signaling based on 1) expansion of Wnt signaling in nkd mutants, 2) by overexpression of Nkd mimicking loss of Wnt signaling, and 3) by the binding of Nkd protein to the Wnt signal transducing protein Dishevelled (Dsh).

Nkd proteins consist of at least four conserved blocks of amino acid sequence interspersed by variable regions. The conserved sequence blocks, from N-terminal to C-terminal, are as follows: 1) a N-terminal membrane anchoring motif, which in mammals is subject to myristoylation; 2) a single, extended EF hand motif (called "EFX" or "NH2") that binds Dsh/Dvl proteins; 3) a thirty amino acid amphipathic alpha helix motif that in the fly Nkd protein mediates nuclear translocation and that in the human Nkd1 protein interferes with the interaction between the EF-hand motif and Dvl proteins; and 4) a C-terminal Histidine-rich sequence that mediates homo-oligomerization and hetero-oligomerization with Axin.

Vertebrate and invertebrate Nkd proteins have additional unique regions of homology that presumably mediate clade-specific protein functions. For example, Nkd2 but not Nkd1 associates with the secreted EGF-family ligand TGF alpha via a sequence between the third and fourth block that is only in Nkd2, and a sequence between the third and fourth block that is highly conserved in Drosophila species but is neither present in the more distantly related mosquito Anopheles gambiae Nkd nor in any known vertebrate Nkds mediates nuclear import via binding to the nuclear import factor importin-alpha3.

There are two Nkd proteins (Nkd1 and Nkd2) in most vertebrates including humans, but some lower vertebrates have additional Nkd proteins (e.g. Nkd3 in zebrafish). Mice with a mutant Nkd1 protein had a mild sperm maturation defect, but mice lacking both Nkd1 and Nkd2 were viable without obvious sperm defects. In zebrafish, Nkd genes regulate Wnt signaling.

The transcription of Nkd genes is inducible by Wnt and other signaling pathways in diverse animals, such that the nkd expression pattern can represent a readout of canonical Wnt activity. Since Nkd inhibits Wnt signaling, the Nkd genes comprise a negative feedback mechanism.
