= Axin-1 =

Protein found in humans

AXIN1
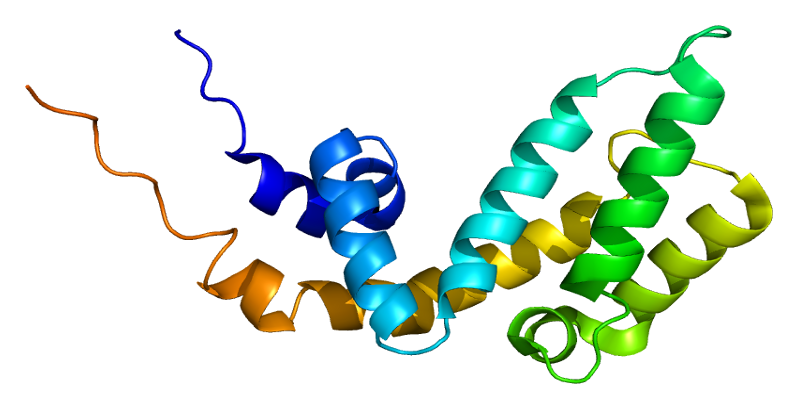

Identifiers
- Aliases: AXIN1, AXIN, PPP1R49, axin 1
- External IDs: OMIM: 603816; MGI: 1096327; GeneCards: AXIN1
Available structures
PDB	Ortholog search: PDBe RCSB
PDB	List of PDB id codes 1DK8, 1EMU, 1O9U, 3ZDI, 4B7T, 4NM0, 4NM3, 4NM5, 4NM7, 4NU1

Gene location (Human)
Chr.	Chromosome 16 (human)
Band	16p13.3	Start	287,440 bp
Band	16p13.3	End	352,723 bp

Gene location (Mouse)
Chr.	Chromosome 17 (mouse)
Band	17 A3.3|17 13.07 cM	Start	26,357,662 bp
Band	17 A3.3|17 13.07 cM	End	26,414,785 bp
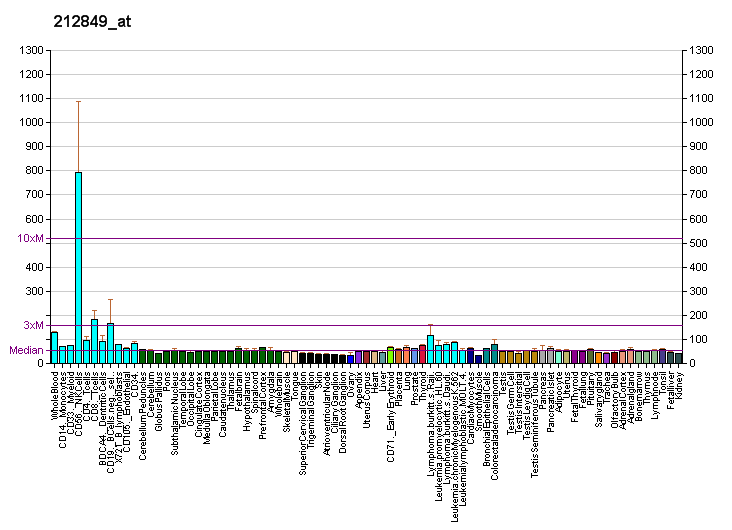
RNA expression pattern
Bgee	Human / Mouse (ortholog); Top expressed in: granulocyte; mucosa of transverse colon; right hemisphere of cerebellum; gastrocnemius muscle; skin of leg; mononuclear cell; monocyte; skin of abdomen; blood; popliteal artery / Top expressed in: Ileal epithelium; tail of embryo; ventricular zone; genital tubercle; epiblast; zygote; Paneth cell; corneal stroma; thymus; granulocyte; More reference expression data
BioGPS	More reference expression data
Gene ontology
Molecular function	beta-catenin binding; protein homodimerization activity; I-SMAD binding; GTPase activator activity; protein binding; enzyme binding; signaling receptor complex adaptor activity; SMAD binding; ubiquitin protein ligase binding; molecular adaptor activity; protein kinase binding; armadillo repeat domain binding; identical protein binding; signaling adaptor activity
Cellular component	cytoplasm; cytosol; lateral plasma membrane; membrane; plasma membrane; perinuclear region of cytoplasm; cytoplasmic vesicle; nucleus; beta-catenin destruction complex; cell periphery
Biological process	forebrain anterior/posterior pattern specification; negative regulation of fat cell differentiation; positive regulation of protein phosphorylation; olfactory placode formation; positive regulation of protein catabolic process; positive regulation of canonical Wnt signaling pathway; embryonic eye morphogenesis; negative regulation of Wnt signaling pathway; positive regulation of JNK cascade; negative regulation of transcription elongation from RNA polymerase II promoter; positive regulation of peptidyl-serine phosphorylation; positive regulation of transcription, DNA-templated; multicellular organism development; lens placode formation; determination of left/right symmetry; canonical Wnt signaling pathway involved in neural plate anterior/posterior pattern formation; positive regulation of ubiquitin-protein transferase activity; positive regulation of peptidyl-threonine phosphorylation; positive regulation of ubiquitin-dependent protein catabolic process; cytoplasmic microtubule organization; canonical Wnt signaling pathway; embryonic skeletal joint morphogenesis; axial mesoderm formation; positive regulation of protein ubiquitination; activation of protein kinase activity; muscle cell development; Wnt-activated signaling pathway involved in forebrain neuron fate commitment; negative regulation of canonical Wnt signaling pathway; signal transduction; apoptotic process; beta-catenin destruction complex disassembly; positive regulation of GTPase activity; Wnt signaling pathway; beta-catenin destruction complex assembly; regulation of Wnt signaling pathway; regulation of intracellular estrogen receptor signaling pathway
Sources:Amigo / QuickGO
Orthologs
Databases	NCBI: entry; OMA: entry
Species	Human	Mouse
Entrez	8312	12005
Ensembl	ENSG00000103126	ENSMUSG00000024182
UniProt	O15169	O35625
RefSeq (mRNA)	NM_003502; NM_181050	NM_001159598; NM_009733; NM_001394381; NM_001394382; NM_001394389
RefSeq (protein)	NP_003493; NP_851393	NP_001153070; NP_033863; NP_001381310; NP_001381311; NP_001381318
Location (UCSC)	Chr 16: 0.29 – 0.35 Mb	Chr 17: 26.36 – 26.41 Mb
PubMed search
- Wikidata
View/Edit Human	View/Edit Mouse

Axin-1 is a protein that in humans is encoded by the AXIN1 gene.

== Function ==
This gene encodes a cytoplasmic protein which contains a regulator of G-protein signaling (RGS) domain and a dishevelled and axin (DIX) domain. The encoded protein interacts with adenomatosis polyposis coli, catenin (cadherin-associated protein) beta 1, glycogen synthase kinase 3 beta, protein phosphatase 2, and itself. This protein functions as a negative regulator of the wingless-type MMTV integration site family, member 1 (WNT) signaling pathway and can induce apoptosis. The crystal structure of a portion of this protein, alone and in a complex with other proteins, has been resolved. Mutations in this gene have been associated with hepatocellular carcinoma, hepatoblastomas, ovarian endometrioid adenocarcinomas, and medulloblastomas. Two transcript variants encoding distinct isoforms have been identified for this gene.

The AXIN proteins attract substantial interest in cancer research as AXIN1 and AXIN2 work synergistically to control pro-oncogenic β-catenin signaling. Importantly, activity in the β-catenin destruction complex can be increased by tankyrase inhibitors and are a potential therapeutic option to reduce the growth of β-catenin-dependent cancers. Mutation in AXIN1 can provoke cancerous disease. AXIN1-truncating mutations at least partially affect β-catenin regulation, whereas this is only the case for a subset of missense mutations. Consistently, most colorectal and liver cancers carrying missense variants acquire mutations in other β-catenin regulatory genes such as APC and CTNNB1. Thus AXIN1 has emerged as an important oncogene in various gastrointestinal and liver cancers.

== Structure ==
The full-length human protein comprises 862 amino acids with a (predicted) molecular mass of 96 kDa. The N-terminal RGS domain, a GSK3 kinase interacting peptide of Axin1 and homologs of the C-terminal DIX domains have been solved at atomic resolution. Large WNT-downregulating central regions have been characterized as intrinsically disordered by biophysical experiments and bioinformatic analysis. Biophysical destabilization of the folded RGS domain induces formation of nanoaggregates that expose and locally concentrate intrinsically disordered regions, which in turn misregulate Wnt signalling. Many other large IDPs (Intrinsically Disordered Proteins) are affected by missense mutations, such as BRCA1, Adenomatous polyposis coli, CREB-binding protein/(CBP) and might be affected in similar ways by missense mutations of their folded domains.

== Interactions ==
AXIN1 has been shown to interact with:

- APC,
- CTNNB1,
- CSNK1E,
- CSNK1A1,
- DVL1,
- GSK3B,
- LRP5,
- MAP3K1,
- PPP2R5A,
- RNF43, and
- TSC2.
