= Agricultural extension =

Farm efficiency through education

Agricultural extension is the application of scientific research and new knowledge to agricultural practices through farmer education. The field of 'extension' now encompasses a wider range of communication and learning activities organized for rural people by educators from different disciplines, including agriculture, agricultural marketing, health, and business studies.

Extension practitioners can be found throughout the world, usually working for government agencies. They are represented by several professional organizations, networks and extension journals.

Agricultural extension agencies in developing countries receive large amounts of support from international development organizations such as the World Bank and the Food and Agriculture Organization of the United Nations.

== Extension terminology ==
The use of the word 'extension' originated in England in 1866. Modern extension began in Dublin, Ireland, in 1847 with Lord Clarendon's itinerant instructors during the Great Famine. It expanded in Germany in the 1850s, through the itinerant agricultural teachers called Wanderlehrer, and later in the United States via the cooperative extension system authorized by the Smith–Lever Act of 1914. The term was later adopted in the US, while in Britain it was replaced with "advisory service" in the 20th century. A number of other terms are used in different parts of the world to describe the same or similar concept:

- Arabic: Al-Ershad ("guidance")
- Bengali: সম্প্রসারণ (shomprosharon 'extension')
- Dutch: Voorlichting ("lighting the path")
- German: Beratung ("advisory work")
- French: Vulgarisation ("popularization")
- Italian: Assistenza tecnica e divulgazione agricola ("agricultural technical assistance and popularization")
- Spanish: Capacitación ("training", "capacity building")
- Thai, Lao: Song-Suem ("to promote")
- Persian: Tarvij & Gostaresh ("to promote and to extend") - ترویج و گسترش
- Hindi: vistaar ("to extend")- विस्तार
- Somali: hormarin & ballaarin' ("to promote and extend"')
- Nepali: प्रसार

In the US, an extension agent is a university employee who develops and delivers educational programs to assist people in economic and community development, leadership, family issues, agriculture and environment. Extension agents also provide youth activities and programs like 4-H. Many extension agents work for cooperative extension service programs at land-grant universities. They are sometimes referred to as county agents, or extension educators. Often confused with extension agents, extension specialists are subject-matter experts usually employed as scientists and university professors in various departments in the land-grant university system. Subjects range from agriculture, life sciences, economics, engineering, food safety, pest management, veterinary medicine, and various other allied disciplines. These subject matter specialists work with agents (usually in a statewide or regional team environment) to support programs within the cooperative extension system.

== Historical definitions ==
The examples given below are taken from a number of books on extension published over a period of more than 50 years:

- 1949: The central task of extension is to help rural families help themselves by applying science, whether physical or social, to the daily routines of farming, homemaking, and family and community living.
- 1965: Agricultural extension has been described as a system of out-of-school education for rural people.
- 1966: Extension personnel have the task of bringing scientific knowledge to farm families in the farms and homes. The object of the task is to improve the efficiency of agriculture.
- 1973: Extension is a service or system which assists farm people, through educational procedures, in improving farming methods and techniques, increasing production efficiency and income, bettering their standard of living and lifting social and educational standards.
- 1974: Extension involves the conscious use of communication of information to help people form sound opinions and make good decisions.
- 1982: Agricultural Extension: Assistance to farmers to help them identify and analyze their production problems and become aware of the opportunities for improvement.
- 1988: Extension is a professional communication intervention deployed by an institution to induce change in voluntary behaviors with a presumed public or collective utility.
- 1997: Extension is the organized exchange of information and the deliberate transfer of skills.
- 1999: The essence of agricultural extension is to facilitate interplay and nurture synergies within a total information system involving agricultural research, agricultural education and a vast complex of information-providing businesses.
- 2004: Extension is a series of embedded communicative interventions that are meant, among other goals, to develop and/or induce innovations which help to resolve (usually multi-actor) problematic situations.
- 2006: Extension is the process of enabling change in individuals, communities and industries involved in the primary industry sector and in natural resource management.

== History ==
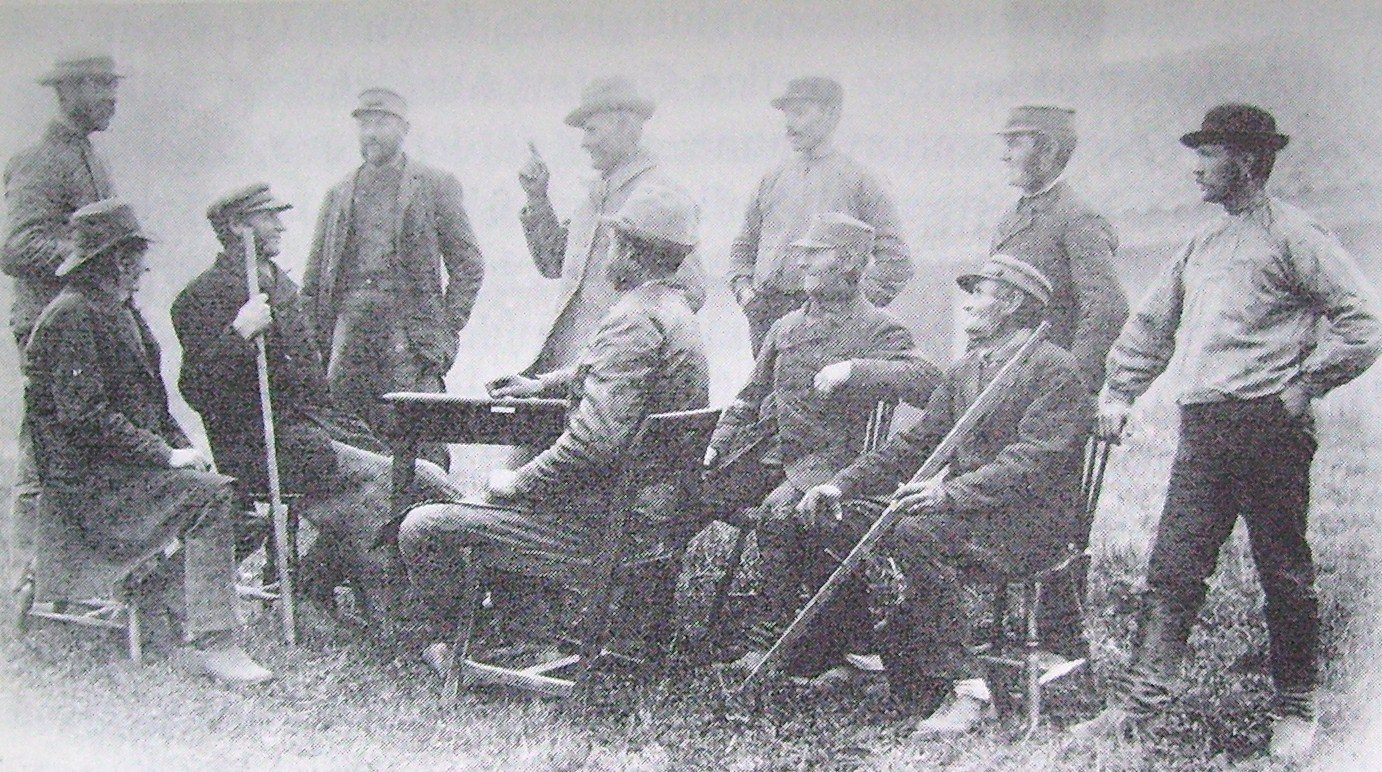
Agricultural extension meeting in a 19th-century Swedish village

=== Origins of agricultural extension ===
It is not known where or when the first extension activities took place. It is known, however, that Chinese officials were creating agricultural policies, documenting practical knowledge, and disseminating advice to farmers at least 2,000 years ago. For example, in approximately 800 BC, the minister responsible for agriculture under one of the Zhou dynasty emperors organized the teaching of crop rotation and drainage to farmers. The minister also leased equipment to farmers, built grain stores and supplied free food during times of famine.

The birth of the modern extension service has been attributed to events that took place in Ireland in the middle of the 19th century. Between 1845–51 the Irish potato crop was destroyed by fungal diseases and a severe famine occurred. The British Government arranged for "practical instructors" to travel to rural areas and teach small farmers how to cultivate alternative crops. This scheme attracted the attention of government officials in Germany, who organized their own system of traveling instructors. By the end of the 19th century, the idea had spread to Denmark, Netherlands, Italy, and France.

The term "university extension" was first used by the Universities of Cambridge and Oxford in 1867 to describe teaching activities that extended the work of the institution beyond the campus. Most of these early activities were not, however, related to agriculture. It was not until the beginning of the 20th century, when colleges in the United States started conducting demonstrations at agricultural shows and giving lectures to farmer’s clubs, that the term "extension service" was applied to the type of work that we now recognize by that name.

In the United States, the Hatch Act of 1887 established a system of agricultural experiment stations in conjunction with each state's land-grant university, and the Smith-Lever Act of 1914 created a system of cooperative extension to be operated by those universities in order to inform people about current developments in agriculture, home economics, and related subjects.

In 1966 the National Sea Grant College Program was established and Bill Wick developed the first Marine Advisory Program in Oregon using the Extension model. The first Marine Extension agent was Bob Jacobsen, and was known as "an agricultural agent in hip-boots".

=== Four generations of extension in Asia ===
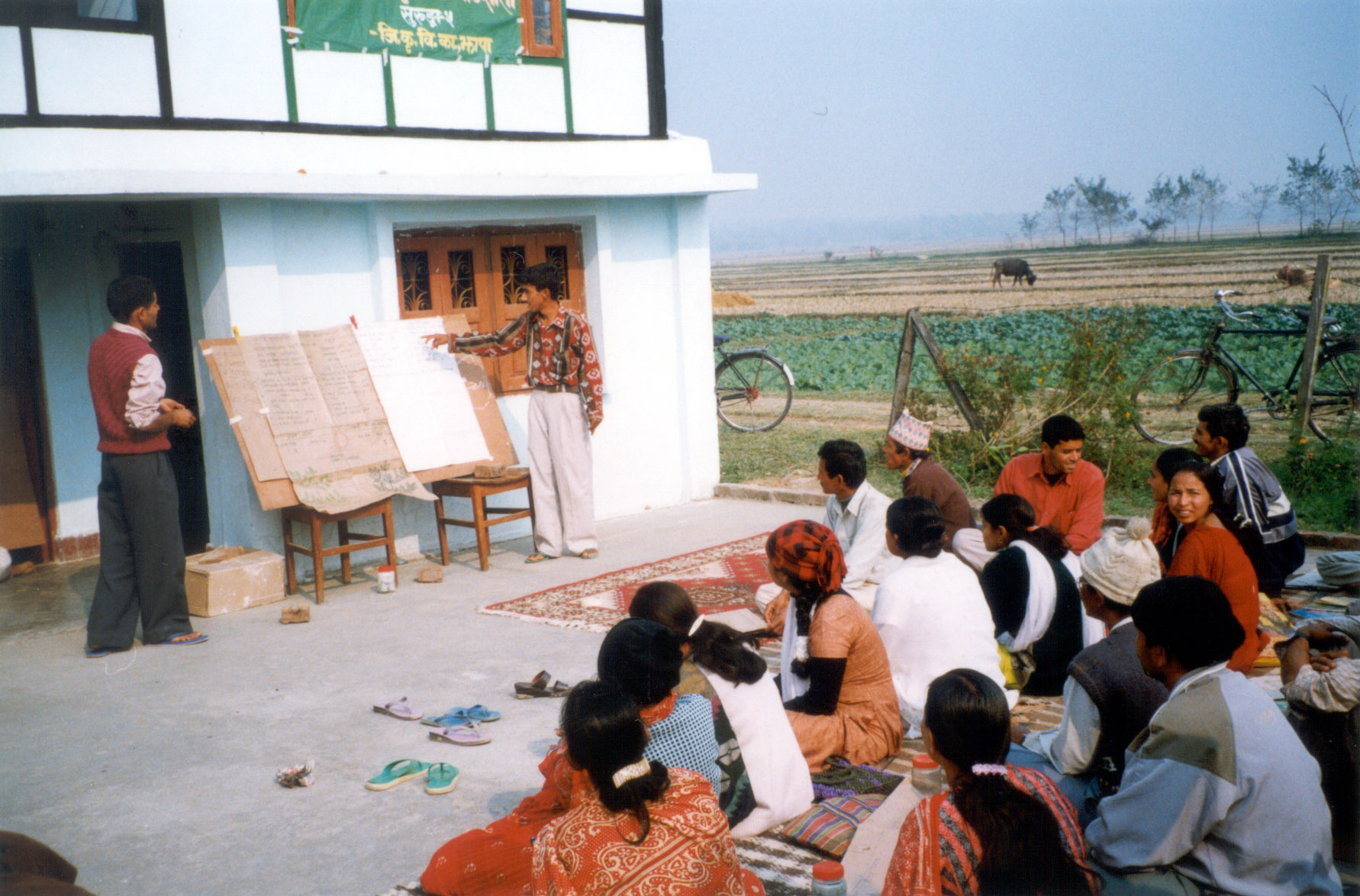
Agricultural extension meeting in Nepal, 2002

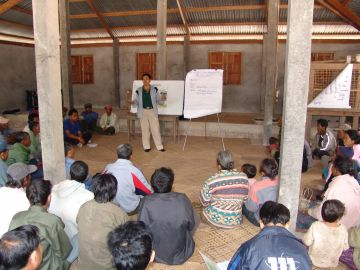
Agricultural extension meeting in Laos, 2006

The development of extension services in modern Asia has differed from country to country. Despite the variations, it is possible to identify a general sequence of four periods or "generations":

- Colonial agriculture: Experimental stations were established in many Asian countries by the colonial powers. The focus of attention was usually on export crops such as rubber, tea, cotton, and sugar. Technical advice was provided to plantation managers and large landowners. Assistance to small farmers who grew subsistence crops was rare, except in times of crisis.
- Diverse top-down extension: After independence, commodity-based extension services emerged from the remnants of the colonial system, with production targets established as part of five-year development plans. In addition, various schemes were initiated to meet the needs of small farmers, with support from foreign donors.
- Unified top-down extension: During the 1970s and 1980s, the Training and Visit system (T&V) was introduced by the World Bank. Existing organizations were merged into a single national service. Regular messages were delivered to groups of farmers, promoting the adoption of "Green Revolution" technologies.
- Diverse bottom-up extension: When World Bank funding came to an end, the T&V system collapsed in many countries, leaving behind a patchwork of programs and projects funded from various other sources. The decline of central planning, combined with a growing concern for sustainability and equity, has resulted in participatory methods gradually replacing top-down approaches.

The fourth generation is well established in some countries, while it has only just begun in other places. While it seems likely that participatory approaches will continue to spread in the next few years, it is impossible to predict the long-term future of extension. Compared to the early 2000s, agricultural extension now receives considerably less support from donor agencies. Among academics working in this field, some have recently argued that agricultural extension needs to be reinvented as a professional practice. Other authors have abandoned the idea of extension as a distinct concept and prefer to think in terms of "knowledge systems" in which farmers are seen as experts rather than adopters.

Aspects of future extension education:

- Evolution of extension system and operationalisation of approaches
- Future extension education initiatives
- Collegiate participation of farmers
- Web enabled technology dissemination
- Developing cases as tools for technology dissemination
- Agriculture as a profitable venture
- Scaling up of group mobilization
- Micro-enterprise promotion

Several of the institutional innovations that have come up in response to the weaknesses in public research and extension system have given enough indications of the emergence of an agricultural innovation system in India. This has resulted in the blurring of the clearly demarcated institutional boundaries between research, extension, farmers, farmers' groups, NGOs and private enterprises. Extension should play the role of facilitating the access to and transfer of knowledge among the different entities involved in the innovation system and create competent institutional modes to improve the overall performance of the innovation system. Inability to play this important role would further marginalize extension efforts.

== Communication processes ==
The term "extension" has been used to cover widely differing communication systems. Two particular issues help to define the type of extension: how communication takes place, and why it takes place.

The related but separate field of agricultural communication has emerged to contribute to in-depth examinations of the communication processes among various actors within and external to the agricultural system. This field refers to the participatory extension model as a form of public relations-rooted two-way symmetric communication based on mutual respect, understanding, and influence between an organization and its stakeholders.

Agricultural communication can take three modes—face-to-face training, training "products" such as manuals and videos, or information and communication technologies (ICTs), such as radio and short message system (SMS). The most effective systems facilitate two-way communication and often combine different modes.

== Four paradigms of agricultural extension ==
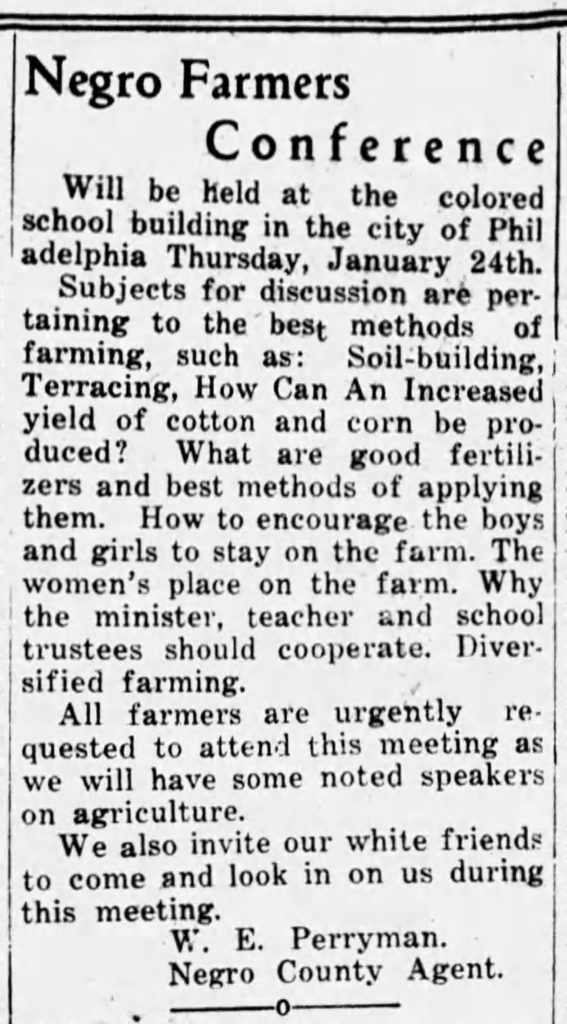
Announcement by a county agricultural agent of a farmers conference held in Philadelphia, Mississippi, on January 24, 1929

Any particular extension system can be described in terms of both how communication takes place and why it takes place. It is not the case that paternalistic systems are always persuasive, nor is it the case that participatory projects are necessarily educational. Instead, there are four possible combinations, each of which represents a different extension paradigm, as follows:

- Technology transfer (persuasive + paternalistic): This paradigm was prevalent in colonial times and reappeared in the 1970s and 1980s when the "Training and Visit" system was established across Asia. Technology transfer involves a top-down approach that delivers specific recommendations to farmers about the practices they should adopt.
- Advisory work (persuasive + participatory): This paradigm can be seen today where government organizations or private consulting companies respond to farmers' inquiries with technical prescriptions. It also takes the form of projects managed by donor agencies and NGOs that use participatory approaches to promote predetermined packages of technology.
- Human resource development (educational + paternalistic): This paradigm dominated the earliest days of extension in Europe and North America, when universities gave training to rural people who were too poor to attend full-time courses. It continues today in the outreach activities of colleges around the world. Top-down teaching methods are employed, but students are expected to make their own decisions about how to use the knowledge they acquire.
- Facilitation for empowerment (educational + participatory): This paradigm involves methods such as experiential learning and farmer-to-farmer exchanges. Knowledge is gained through interactive processes and the participants are encouraged to make their own decisions. The best known examples in Asia are projects that use Farmer Field Schools (FFS) or participatory technology development (PTD).

There is some disagreement about whether or not the concept and name of 'extension' really encompasses all four paradigms. Some experts believe that the term should be restricted to persuasive approaches, while others believe it should only be used for educational activities. Paulo Freire has argued that the terms ‘extension’ and ‘participation’ are contradictory. There are philosophical reasons behind these disagreements. From a practical point of view, however, communication processes that conform to each of these four paradigms are currently being organized under the name of extension in one part of the world or another. Pragmatically, if not ideologically, all of these activities are considered to be represented in agricultural extension.

== See also ==
- Cooperative extension service
- Diffusion of innovations
- Extension agency
- Farmer Field School
- Farmer Research Committee
- Home demonstration clubs
- Participatory technology development
- Participatory video
- Spore (agricultural publication)
- Krishi Vigyan Kendra
