= PTD-DBM =

Identifiers
- CAS Number: 1609454-11-6
- PubChem CID: 176453931

Chemical and physical data
- Formula: C_{124}H_{225}N_{61}O_{28}S_{2}
- Molar mass: 3082.68 g·mol^{−1}
- 3D model (JSmol): Interactive image
- SMILES: CC[C@H](C)[C@@H](C(=O)N[C@@H](CS)C(=O)N[C@@H](CCCCN)C(=O)N[C@@H](CC1=CC=CC=C1)C(=O)N[C@@H](CCCNC(=N)N)C(=O)N[C@@H](CCCCN)C(=O)N[C@@H](CS)C(=O)O)NC(=O)[C@H](CCC(=O)N)NC(=O)[C@H](CC2=CN=CN2)NC(=O)CNC(=O)[C@H]([C@@H](C)O)NC(=O)[C@H](CCCCN)NC(=O)[C@H](CCCNC(=N)N)NC(=O)CNC(=O)CNC(=O)CNC(=O)CNC(=O)[C@H](CCCNC(=N)N)NC(=O)[C@H](CCCNC(=N)N)NC(=O)[C@H](CCCNC(=N)N)NC(=O)[C@H](CCCNC(=N)N)NC(=O)[C@H](CCCNC(=N)N)NC(=O)[C@H](CCCNC(=N)N)NC(=O)[C@H](CCCNC(=N)N)NC(=O)[C@H](CCCNC(=N)N)N
- InChI: InChI=1S/C124H225N61O28S2/c1-4-65(2)93(113(211)182-85(62-214)111(209)179-72(27-8-11-41-125)105(203)181-83(54-67-24-6-5-7-25-67)109(207)178-81(38-23-53-160-124(148)149)104(202)171-73(28-9-12-42-126)106(204)183-86(63-215)114(212)213)184-108(206)82(39-40-87(129)187)180-110(208)84(55-68-56-150-64-166-68)168-92(192)61-165-112(210)94(66(3)186)185-107(205)74(29-10-13-43-127)172-97(195)71(31-16-46-153-117(134)135)167-91(191)60-163-89(189)58-161-88(188)57-162-90(190)59-164-96(194)70(30-15-45-152-116(132)133)170-99(197)76(33-18-48-155-119(138)139)174-101(199)78(35-20-50-157-121(142)143)176-103(201)80(37-22-52-159-123(146)147)177-102(200)79(36-21-51-158-122(144)145)175-100(198)77(34-19-49-156-120(140)141)173-98(196)75(32-17-47-154-118(136)137)169-95(193)69(128)26-14-44-151-115(130)131/h5-7,24-25,56,64-66,69-86,93-94,186,214-215H,4,8-23,26-55,57-63,125-128H2,1-3H3,(H2,129,187)(H,150,166)(H,161,188)(H,162,190)(H,163,189)(H,164,194)(H,165,210)(H,167,191)(H,168,192)(H,169,193)(H,170,197)(H,171,202)(H,172,195)(H,173,196)(H,174,199)(H,175,198)(H,176,201)(H,177,200)(H,178,207)(H,179,209)(H,180,208)(H,181,203)(H,182,211)(H,183,204)(H,184,206)(H,185,205)(H,212,213)(H4,130,131,151)(H4,132,133,152)(H4,134,135,153)(H4,136,137,154)(H4,138,139,155)(H4,140,141,156)(H4,142,143,157)(H4,144,145,158)(H4,146,147,159)(H4,148,149,160)/t65-,66+,69-,70-,71-,72-,73-,74-,75-,76-,77-,78-,79-,80-,81-,82-,83-,84-,85-,86-,93-,94-/m0/s1; Key:IMXABKONEGYGRF-QAMUXZJLSA-N

Protein transduction domain-fused dishevelled binding motif (PTD-DBM) is a synthetic peptide that promotes hair growth by inhibiting the interaction between CXXC5 and dishevelled (Dvl). CXXC5 is an endogenous protein associated with hair loss that acts as a negative feedback regulator of the Wnt/β-catenin signaling pathway. Topical application of PTD-DBM stimulated new hair follicle formation and hair regrowth in laboratory mice.

PTD-DBM activates the Wnt/β-catenin signaling pathway by disrupting the interaction between CXXC5 and Dvl, an upstream component of the pathway. In mice, topical treatment with PTD-DBM promoted hair regrowth and the formation of new hair follicles. Combining PTD-DBM with valproic acid (VPA), another activator of Wnt/β-catenin signaling, further enhanced hair regrowth and wound-induced hair neogenesis (WIHN). Elevated CXXC5 expression in bald human scalps, together with the hair growth effects observed in mice, suggests that PTD-DBM may have potential as a treatment for hair loss in humans, although its clinical efficacy remains to be established.

== Discovery ==
Professor Kang-Yell Choi and his research team at Yonsei University in South Korea discovered a protein responsible for hair loss in the condition known as androgenetic alopecia. The responsible protein is called CXXC-type zinc finger protein 5 (CXXC5), which acts as a negative regulator for the Wnt/β-catenin pathway, involved in hair regeneration and wound healing. CXXC5 negatively regulates hair growth, and the researchers developed a new substance that promotes hair regeneration by controlling the function of CXXC5. When CXXC5 binds with the Dvl protein, which functions at the upstream of Wnt/β-catenin pathway, it suppresses hair regrowth and hair follicle neogenesis. The observation of CXXC5 overexpression in the bald scalp by Professor Choi’s team led to the development of PTD-DBM, which interferes with the CXXC5-Dvl protein-protein interaction (PPI). By topical application, PTD-DBM enhances hair regrowth as well as neogenesis. The hair growth promoting effect of PTD-DBM is further enhanced when used in combination with a Wnt/β-catenin signaling activator such as VPA, which is generally used as a drug for bipolar disorder and activates the Wnt/β-catenin pathway by inhibition of GSK3β. Currently, topical application of PTD-DBM or its combination with VPA has been used for treatment of hair loss.
