= DAB2IP =

Protein-coding gene in the species Homo sapiens

Identifiers
- Aliases: DAB2IP, AF9Q34, AIP-1, AIP1, DIP1/2, DAB2 interacting protein
- External IDs: OMIM: 609205; MGI: 1916851; GeneCards: DAB2IP
Available structures
PDB	Ortholog search: PDBe RCSB
PDB	List of PDB id codes 2LSW

Gene location (Human)
Chr.	Chromosome 9 (human)
Band	9q33.2	Start	121,567,057 bp
Band	9q33.2	End	121,785,530 bp

Gene location (Mouse)
Chr.	Chromosome 2 (mouse)
Band	2|2 B	Start	35,558,266 bp
Band	2|2 B	End	35,730,994 bp
RNA expression pattern
Bgee	Human / Mouse (ortholog); Top expressed in: right hemisphere of cerebellum; apex of heart; mucosa of ileum; right coronary artery; sural nerve; putamen; Descending thoracic aorta; muscle layer of sigmoid colon; tendon of biceps brachii; ascending aorta / Top expressed in: cerebellar cortex; submandibular gland; ascending aorta; lobe of cerebellum; aortic valve; superior frontal gyrus; cerebellar vermis; primary visual cortex; Gonadal ridge; granulocyte; More reference expression data
BioGPS	n/a
Gene ontology
Molecular function	phosphatidylinositol-3-phosphate binding; GTPase activator activity; SH3 domain binding; phosphatidylinositol 3-kinase regulatory subunit binding; phosphatidylinositol-4-phosphate binding; Toll-like receptor 4 binding; kinase binding; protein phosphatase 2A binding; mitogen-activated protein kinase kinase binding; vascular endothelial growth factor receptor 2 binding; protein homodimerization activity; mitogen-activated protein kinase kinase kinase binding; 14-3-3 protein binding; protein binding; protein kinase binding; death receptor binding; signaling adaptor activity; phosphatidylinositol 3-kinase binding; identical protein binding; cadherin binding; protein-containing complex binding
Cellular component	cytoplasm; cytosol; membrane; intrinsic component of the cytoplasmic side of the plasma membrane; cerebellar mossy fiber; cell projection; neuronal cell body membrane; plasma membrane; endocytic vesicle; axon; soma; parallel fiber; climbing fiber; AIP1-IRE1 complex; dendrite
Biological process	negative regulation of epidermal growth factor receptor signaling pathway; positive regulation of protein catabolic process; positive regulation of JNK cascade; negative regulation of Ras protein signal transduction; negative regulation of endothelial cell migration; positive regulation of protein serine/threonine kinase activity; positive regulation of synapse maturation; positive regulation of IRE1-mediated unfolded protein response; negative regulation of GTPase activity; angiogenesis; negative regulation of epithelial cell proliferation; cell cycle; regulation of protein-containing complex assembly; regulation of I-kappaB kinase/NF-kappaB signaling; apoptotic process; negative regulation of G0 to G1 transition; regulation of GTPase activity; positive regulation of apoptotic signaling pathway; I-kappaB phosphorylation; positive regulation of neuron migration; response to unfolded protein; negative regulation of MAP kinase activity; negative regulation of phosphatidylinositol 3-kinase activity; inflammatory response; regulation of p38MAPK cascade; negative regulation of fibroblast proliferation; positive regulation of MAPK cascade; negative regulation of protein phosphorylation; neuron projection morphogenesis; vascular endothelial growth factor receptor-2 signaling pathway; regulation of protein heterodimerization activity; immune system process; positive regulation of JUN kinase activity; negative regulation of transcription by RNA polymerase II; negative regulation of I-kappaB kinase/NF-kappaB signaling; cellular response to interleukin-1; negative regulation of protein serine/threonine kinase activity; endothelial cell apoptotic process; negative regulation of transcription, DNA-templated; negative regulation of NF-kappaB transcription factor activity; positive regulation of proteasomal protein catabolic process; negative regulation of vascular endothelial growth factor receptor signaling pathway; cellular response to tumor necrosis factor; positive regulation of dendrite development; cell motility involved in cerebral cortex radial glia guided migration; MAPK cascade; negative regulation of phosphatidylinositol 3-kinase signaling; cellular response to epidermal growth factor stimulus; multicellular organism development; tube formation; intrinsic apoptotic signaling pathway in response to endoplasmic reticulum stress; layer formation in cerebral cortex; positive regulation of neuron projection development; positive regulation of apoptotic process; negative regulation of ERK1 and ERK2 cascade; negative regulation of angiogenesis; regulation of growth; cellular response to vascular endothelial growth factor stimulus; negative regulation of vascular endothelial growth factor signaling pathway; cellular response to lipopolysaccharide; negative regulation of epithelial cell migration; extrinsic apoptotic signaling pathway via death domain receptors; negative regulation of epithelial to mesenchymal transition; negative regulation of toll-like receptor 4 signaling pathway; positive regulation of transcription by RNA polymerase II; signal transduction; positive regulation of GTPase activity; innate immune response; negative regulation of cell population proliferation; reelin-mediated signaling pathway; negative regulation of canonical Wnt signaling pathway; Unfolded protein response
Sources:Amigo / QuickGO
Orthologs
Databases	NCBI: entry; OMA: entry
Species	Human	Mouse
Entrez	153090	69601
Ensembl	ENSG00000136848	ENSMUSG00000026883
UniProt	Q5VWQ8	Q3UHC7
RefSeq (mRNA)	NM_032552; NM_138709; NM_001395010	NM_001001602; NM_001114124; NM_001114125; NM_001290637; NM_001290639 NM_001290640; NM_001290641
RefSeq (protein)	NP_115941; NP_619723	NP_001001602; NP_001107596; NP_001107597; NP_001277566; NP_001277568 NP_001277569; NP_001277570
Location (UCSC)	Chr 9: 121.57 – 121.79 Mb	Chr 2: 35.56 – 35.73 Mb
PubMed search
- Wikidata
View/Edit Human	View/Edit Mouse

Disabled homolog 2-interacting protein is a protein that in humans is encoded by the DAB2IP gene.

DAB2IP is a Ras (MIM 190020) GTPase-activating protein (GAP) that acts as a tumor suppressor gene and is inactivated by methylation in prostate and breast cancers (Yano et al., 2005).[supplied by OMIM]

== Interactions ==
DAB2IP has been shown to interact with DAB2.
