= Participatory technology development =

Indonesian farmers carrying out their own research into control of tungro disease on rice (Photo by FAO Community IPM Programme).

Participatory technology development (PTD) is an approach to learning and innovation that is used in international development as part of projects and programmes relating to sustainable agriculture. The approach involves collaboration between researchers and farmers in the analysis of agricultural problems and testing of alternative farming practices.

== Origins ==
The origins of Participatory Technology Development can be found in a number of approaches, concepts and techniques that became popular in the 1970s and 1980s:

- Farming systems research and extension, is an approach that introduced social-economic issues into organisations previously dominated by biological and chemical scientists. FSR/E also promoted the idea of 'on-farm' trials;
- Appropriate technology, is a concept that recognises the importance of matching the design of technology to the resources and culture of the user.
- Indigenous technical knowledge, is a concept that recognises the importance of local expertise and traditional wisdom;
- Participatory rural appraisal, is a set of techniques that promoted the involvement of rural people in decision-making.

== Process ==
One of the leading authorities on this process is the Centre for learning on sustainable agriculture - ILEIA based in the Netherlands. ILEIA has described PTD as “a process between local communities and outside facilitators which involves:

- gaining a joint understanding of the main characteristics and changes of that particular agro-ecological system;
- defining priority problems;
- experimenting locally with a variety of options derived both from indigenous knowledge … and from formal science, and
- enhancing farmer’s experimental capacities and farmer-to-farmer communication”.

== Facilitators ==
PTD facilitators are usually researchers, sometimes consisting of a team that includes both biological and social scientists. While PTD is closely linked to research, it often crosses the boundary into agricultural extension because it involves learning activities with farmers.

== See also ==
- Agroecology
- Farmer Field School
- Farmer Research Committee
- Participatory development
- Participatory rural appraisal
- Public participation
