= CXXC5 =

Protein-coding gene in the species Homo sapiens

Identifiers
- Aliases: CXXC5, CF5, RINF, WID, HSPC195, CXXC finger protein 5
- External IDs: OMIM: 612752; MGI: 1914643; GeneCards: CXXC5

Gene location (Human)
| Chr. | Chromosome 5 (human) |
| Band | 5q31.2 | Start | 139,647,299 bp |
| Band | 5q31.2 | End | 139,683,882 bp |

Gene location (Mouse)
| Chr. | Chromosome 18 (mouse) |
| Band | 18|18 B2 | Start | 35,962,450 bp |
| Band | 18|18 B2 | End | 35,994,741 bp |
RNA expression pattern
| Bgee | Human / Mouse (ortholog); Top expressed in: pancreatic ductal cell; renal medulla; inferior ganglion of vagus nerve; medulla oblongata; ventral tegmental area; superior vestibular nucleus; cerebellum; nasal epithelium; pons; cerebellar hemisphere / Top expressed in: Epithelium of choroid plexus; tail of embryo; lens; ciliary body; iris; cerebellar cortex; epithelium of lens; islet of Langerhans; Rostral migratory stream; vestibular membrane of cochlear duct; More reference expression data |
| BioGPS | n/a |
Gene ontology
| Molecular function | sequence-specific DNA binding; DNA binding; zinc ion binding; transcription factor binding; protein binding; signal transducer activity; metal ion binding |
| Cellular component | nucleus; nucleoplasm; cytoplasm; cytosol |
| Biological process | positive regulation of I-kappaB kinase/NF-kappaB signaling; negative regulation of transcription by RNA polymerase II; transcription, DNA-templated; signal transduction |
Sources:Amigo / QuickGO
Orthologs
| Databases | NCBI: entry; OMA: entry |
| Species | Human | Mouse |
| Entrez | 51523 | 67393 |
| Ensembl | ENSG00000171604 | ENSMUSG00000046668 |
| UniProt | Q7LFL8 | Q91WA4 |
| RefSeq (mRNA) | NM_016463; NM_001317199; NM_001317200; NM_001317201; NM_001317202 NM_001317203; NM_001317204; NM_001317205; NM_001317206; NM_001317207; NM_001317208; NM_001317209; NM_001317210; NM_001317211 | NM_133687; NM_001357458; NM_001357459 |
| RefSeq (protein) | NP_001304128; NP_001304129; NP_001304130; NP_001304131; NP_001304132 NP_001304133; NP_001304134; NP_001304135; NP_001304136; NP_001304137; NP_001304138; NP_001304139; NP_001304140; NP_057547 | NP_598448; NP_001344387; NP_001344388 |
| Location (UCSC) | Chr 5: 139.65 – 139.68 Mb | Chr 18: 35.96 – 35.99 Mb |
| PubMed search |
- Wikidata
| View/Edit Human | View/Edit Mouse |

CXXC-type zinc finger protein 5 is a protein that is encoded by the CXXC5 gene in humans.

As indicated by its name, the CXXC5 plays a role as a transcription factor in the nucleus of cells, and involved in myelopoiesis, endothelial differentiation, vessel formation, and oligodendrocyte differentiation.

The CXXC5 is also characterized as a negative feedback regulator of the Wnt/β-catenin signaling pathway functioning by direct interaction with the Dishevelled (Dvl) protein in the cytosol. The cytosolic overexpression of CXXC5 was induced by several pathophysiological conditions, such as osteoporosis, alopecia, senescence of growth plate, cutaneous wound, and restoration of the suppressed Wnt/β-catenin signaling by blockade of its Dvl binding function improved the pathological features as observed in Cxxc5^{-/-} mice. These results indicate that the Dvl binding with cytosolic CXXC5 could be a target for the development of agents for treating alopecia, acute wound, and short stature in childhood and adolescence, which exhibit suppressed Wnt/β-catenin signaling by cytosolic CXXC5 overexpression of the responsible tissue cells. The CXXC5-Dvl protein-protein interaction (PPI) as a target for development of agents in hair loss or acute wound was also confirmed by construction and testing the function of PTD-DBM, a peptide inhibiting the CXXC5-Dvl PPIl.

The improvement of abnormalities by the CXXC5-Dvl PPI inhibitor is attributed to restoration of damaged tissues by activating the stem cells through restorative activation of the suppressed Wnt/β-catenin signaling and its target genes involving regeneration.
