= Zinc finger protein 165 =

Protein found in humans

ZNF165

Identifiers
- Aliases: ZNF165, CT53, LD65, ZSCAN7, zinc finger protein 165
- External IDs: OMIM: 600834; GeneCards: ZNF165

Gene location (Human)
Chr.	Chromosome 6 (human)
Band	6p22.1	Start	28,080,568 bp
Band	6p22.1	End	28,089,563 bp
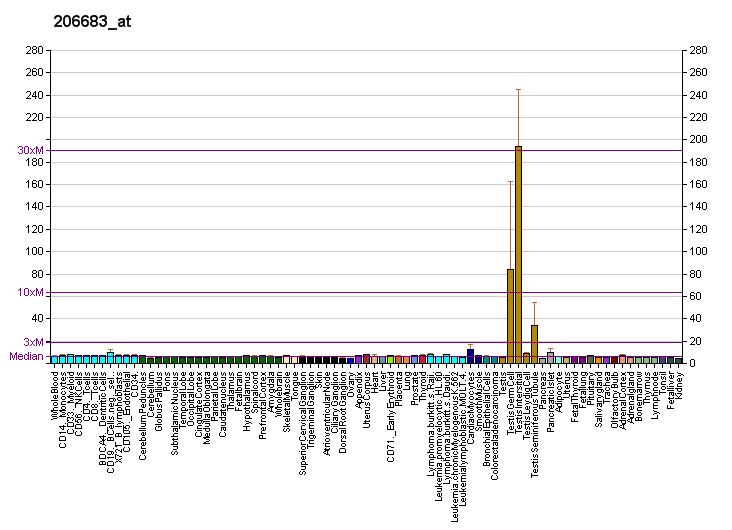
RNA expression pattern
Bgee	Human / Mouse (ortholog); Top expressed in: sperm; gonad; testicle; amniotic fluid; left testis; right testis; mucosa of sigmoid colon; islet of Langerhans; body of pancreas; rectum / n/a; More reference expression data
BioGPS	More reference expression data
Gene ontology
Molecular function	DNA binding; protein binding; metal ion binding; nucleic acid binding; DNA-binding transcription factor activity; DNA-binding transcription factor activity, RNA polymerase II-specific
Cellular component	nucleus
Biological process	regulation of transcription, DNA-templated; transcription, DNA-templated; regulation of transcription by RNA polymerase II
Sources:Amigo / QuickGO
Orthologs
Databases	NCBI: entry; OMA: entry
Species	Human	Mouse
Entrez	7718	n/a
Ensembl	ENSG00000197279	n/a
UniProt	P49910; Q53Z40	n/a
RefSeq (mRNA)	NM_003447; NM_001376491; NM_001376492; NM_001376493; NM_001376494	n/a
RefSeq (protein)	NP_003438; NP_001363420; NP_001363421; NP_001363422; NP_001363423 NP_003438.1	n/a
Location (UCSC)	Chr 6: 28.08 – 28.09 Mb	n/a
PubMed search		n/a
- Wikidata
View/Edit Human

Zinc finger protein 165 is a protein that in humans is encoded by the ZNF165 gene.

== Function ==
This gene encodes a member of the Kruppel family of zinc finger proteins. Members of this DNA-binding protein family act as transcriptional regulators. This gene is located within a cluster of zinc finger family members. The encoded protein may play a role in spermatogenesis.

== Interactions ==
Zinc finger protein 165 has been shown to interact with Ewing sarcoma breakpoint region 1 and DVL2.

== See also ==
- Zinc finger
