= Farmer Research Committee =

Farmer Research Committees (also known in Latin America as Comites de Investigacion Agropecuario Local or CIALs ) are an approach to community organizing and agricultural extension, providing rural communities and farmer organizations in developing countries with adaptive research and technology testing services run by volunteer farmers.

This approach to agricultural innovation is used in international development and rural community development for improving adoption of appropriate technology and the development of sustainable agriculture, the committees collaborate with extension agents, farmers and researchers to develop locally acceptable farming practices, and empower community farmers to adopt them.

Farmer Research Committees do adaptive research experiments to help farmers manage the risk of trying something new that extension has not validated under local conditions. In Latin America, numerous Farmer Research Committees have been particularly effective in evaluating and selecting new varieties and multiplying seed, enabling large numbers of farmers to access a new variety at low cost, improve their food security, generate employment and increase their income. On a lesser scale, Farmer Research Committees have worked on small machinery, fertilisers or pest and disease control regimes, enabling the adoption of cost-effective strategies in which local farmers have confidence. Farmer Research Committees may have an important role to play in rural communities' adaptation of their agriculture to climate change and globalization because they increase community-level innovative and adaptive capacity by strengthening its human and social capital.

In contrast to Farmer Field Schools which are intended to transmit proven extension recommendations to farmers using experimentation for discovery learning, Farmer Research Committees set out to generate new recommendations. Their results are usually a novel blend of what was already known and what was unknown, drawing on both indigenous technical knowledge and external resources. Farmer research committees and farmer field schools can be highly complementary, as is discussed in more detail below

== Costs ==
Most of the costs of establishing a Farmer Research Committee are a one-off investment incurred during the first year for training and a petty cash or inputs fund for operations.

- Training of a facilitator, who may be a salaried extension professional or a para-professional farmer, involves a 5-day, on-site course and then follow-up visits by trainers to reinforce field practice. In Latin America, trainers use cellphones and the internet to mentor trainees. Numerous professionals experienced in Farmer Research Committee training exist in Latin America.
- Training a Farmer Research Committee involves learning by doing: in the first planting season (usually 4–6 months in the tropics), the facilitator mentors the Committee through a six step process. In the second season, the majority of steps in the process are delegated to the committee, the facilitator's visits are reduced significantly and costs drop by as much as 50 percent. By the third planting system, a Committee is mature and can run its own process with minimal contact with a facilitator. Some mature Committees in Latin America have been running their own process in this way for over 5 years.
- In Latin America the start-up fund for Committee operations can range from US$25 to US$200 in cash or kind, depending on the costs of experimental inputs not available locally. The average yearly cost for running a Committee was estimated at US$325 over six years in the late 1990s. In approximately 50% of the 200 or so farmer research committees established in Latin America by 2003, 50 percent had maintained or increased the size of this fund, in some cases by selling seed of new varieties they were recommending, in other cases from local contributions.

Farmer Research Committees need a lively and sustained communication with external sources of information and technology to keep on bringing innovations into their experiments. When cellphone coverage exists this can be achieved through cellphone contact and this helps to reduce costs further. A facilitator can support from 20 to 50 mature Farmer Research Committees, depending on distances between them and the availability of cell phones.

Farmer Research Committees enable a research and extension program to improve its relevance and at the same time, expand its coverage at low cost, or reduce its costs for existing coverage. Extension costs can be reduced while quality improves because the committee is a mechanism which encourages farmers to assume some of the costs of adaptive testing and extension of technologies. After training, a Farmer Research Committee takes over the implementation and evaluation of on-farm trials over a multi-year period with minimal outside facilitation, and assumes the job of informing its community of its results on a regular basis. When Farmer Research Committees recommend locally-proven seed and input-use practices, they and their neighbors know they can have confidence in this information, and this accelerates adoption and innovation. At least 200 pilots of this methodology in Latin America demonstrate the type of support needed to keep a mature farmer research committee running over time and how this enables a small number of technical professionals to accelerate and expand acres of the poor to innovation.

Why are farmers organized in farmer Research Committees willing to assume some of the costs of adaptive testing and extension? The answer lies in thousands of studies of agricultural technology adoption by poor farmers in developing countries. These show how some farmers in a community will always conduct small-scale experiments on their farms to check out whether a blanket recommendation or a technology package from an extension agent actually works in their conditions These studies also show how other farmers will wait to see how these experimenters fare before they too take the risk of innovating. This makes sense because the poor are usually farming in highly unpredictable and risky production environments, for which it is extremely expensive for an extension system to develop precise recommendations. The best these services can do is to come up with technologies that, on the average, are likely to do well. But poor farmers need–and practise—precision farming: they deliberately maximise diversity within small areas on their farms to protect themselves from the risk of a bad season in one micro-environment, or one disease or pest or crop or variety. As a result, farmers are rightly cautious about adopting blanket recommendations, and they do their own on-farm testing to check these recommendations out.

Farmer Research Committees harness an often underutilized resource: the time and money that farmers invest towards testing technologies they don't fully trust or understand. This is why experimenting farmers choose to volunteer as Committee members, regardless of income level, and why they are willing to absorb the costs of adaptive testing. A Farmer Research Committee formalizes the local experimentation that takes place on every farm to some degree, and makes this activity more systematic, informed and efficient for a broader base of beneficiaries. Farmers who volunteer and are elected to be members of Farmer Research Committees are nominated by their communities. When these farmers conduct experiments as a part of a collective, they can replicate their experiments and learn much faster, so the return on their time and other investments increases compared to the testing they complete individually.

== Function ==
A Farmer Research Committee can be elected by any kind of client group or organizations wanting to test and adapt agricultural technology: for example, a community, a rural self-help group, a producer association or a cooperative. The committee researches and advocates for designing, evaluating, and recommending appropriate technologies for the local community, while reporting back regularly on its results and use of funds.

A committee can include anywhere from four to 40 members, depending on the community's size and agricultural operations, and is decided by election. Planning Farmer Research Committees can be greatly assisted by combining the use of a Geographical Information System (GIS) with wealth ranking, a participatory rural appraisal (PRA) tool. An extension system should have at least one Farmer Research Committee per recommendation domain and organize regular contact among Committees for exchange of results.

=== Diagnosis and planning ===
Once elected, a committee organizes a diagnostic process in which all its clients participate to identify a local priority for research. Topics include for example, testing crop varieties, pest control regimes, fertilisers, livestock feeding strategies, producing and marketing new products or alternate soil erosion control technologies. The most important feature of a Committee's research topic is that it tries to solve an important local problem and that there is no readily-available and reliable knowledge of how to solve it already in existence. The diagnostic process involves the Committee in talking to experienced farmers in their locality and visiting experiment stations, agricultural input suppliers and extension offices. By the end of the diagnosis they either have found a solution to the problem or have found several alternative solutions and are not sure which one will be best.

=== Experimentation ===
If the Committee finds that locally-proven technologies are available, it asks farmers experienced with the technology to help them with community-wide training. If however, Committee members are not sure about what will work locally, then they work with their facilitator or extension agent to design an experiment that will compare several unproven solutions. These may be of local or external origin. Farmer Research Committee experiments typically begin with several treatments compared with local practice tested on a very small scale. Over time, the number of treatments is reduced and the size of the experimental plots is increased until one or more technologies are being validated at commercial scale. Committee experiments are usually replicated on the members own farms but the Committee members may also ask other farmers to join in and plant or evaluate experiments.

Farmer Research Committee experiments are evaluated using methodology for farmer evaluation of technology (Guererro, Ashby & Gracia, 1993). This can be applied by farmers to very large or small numbers of treatments to generate a qualitative ranking based on their own criteria for evaluation. The ranking is easy for farmers to understand and report back to the committee's clients. At the same time a statistical package of the analysis of rankings is available for use by technical extension staff, if desired.

=== Reporting back ===
Reporting back involves a Farmer Research Committee in making a regular, formal report on its activities, its results and how it has used its funds to its community or client group. This is a crucial activity that socializes what has been learned from the diagnosis and experimentation by the Farmer Research Committee. Sometimes facilitators neglect this step and focus on developing the capabilities of the committee members, but this gravely under-exploits the committee's potential for wider impact and means that dissemination of the knowledge they generate is unnecessarily restricted to the committee. In addition, reporting back is essential for keeping the Committee accountable for its use of funds and relevant to local priorities.

Committees that are reporting back often invite local politicians, input suppliers, business people and experiment station researchers to this meeting. This is especially useful once a Farmer Committee has validated technology at commercial scale and farmers want to expand production. Some Committees have in this way, convinced local politicians to contribute to their operational costs or to sponsor more committees. Some Committee members have been elected as local political representatives, expanding the credibility of Farmer Committees and demand for their services.

=== Farmer Field Schools ===
The principal mechanisms for dissemination of Farmer Research Committee's results and recommendations are their day-to-day contact with neighbors and their Report Back meeting. However, local farmers may need training in how to implement the committee's recommendations or if the Committee finds a solution that needs no further experimentation, nobody in the community may know how to use it. Running Farmer Field Schools to provide training using Farmer Research Committee recommendations is highly advantageous as it gets locally-relevant, locally validated knowledge out to a larger number of farmers than the committee can usually contact on its own.

== See also ==
- Sustainable development
- Participatory technology development
- Agricultural extension

== Sources ==
- World Bank Agriculture Investment Sourcebook. Module 2 - Local Agricultural Research Committees
- Ashby, J.A., Gracia, A.T., Del Pilar Guerrero, M., Quiros, C.A., Roa, J.I. and Beltran, J.A. 1995. Institutionalizing farmer participation in adaptive technology testing with the "CIAL." ODI Agricultural Research and Extension Network. Network Paper 57.
- A. R. Braun, G. Thiele and M. Fernandez.2000. Farmer field schools and local agricultural Research committees: complementary platforms for integrated decision-making in Sustainable agriculture. ODI Agricultural Research and Extension Network. Network Paper No.105.
- A. Braun and H. Hocde.1998. Farmer Participatory research in Latin America; Four Cases. ACIAR Proceedings ACIAR
- S. Humphries, J. Gonzales, J. Jimenez and F. Sierra. 2000. Searching for sustainable land use practices in Honduras: lessons from a programme of Participatory research with hillside farmers. ODI Agricultural Research and Extension Network. Network Paper No.104
- J. A. Ashby, A. Braun, T. Gracia, M.P. Guerrero, L.A. Hernandez, C.A. Quiros & J.I. Roa. 2001.Investing in Farmers as Researchers: Experience with Local Agricultural Research Committees in Latin America. CIAT, Cali, Colombia.
- S. Humphries, J. Gonzales, O. Gallardo and F. Sierra. 2005. Linking small farmers to the formal research sector: lessons from a participatory bean breeding programme in Honduras. ODI Agricultural Research and Extension Network. Network Paper 142.
- D. Byerlee, 2004. Enhancing Accountability and Impacts of Agricultural Research Systems in Developing Countries. World Bank, Washington, DC. In: New Direction for a Diverse Planet.Proceedings of the 4th International Crop Science Congress, Brisbane Australia 26-1 October, 2004 Brisbane Australia.
