= SPATS1 =

Human protein and coding gene

Identifiers
- Aliases: SPATS1, DDIP, SPATA8, SRSP1, spermatogenesis associated serine rich 1
- External IDs: MGI: 1918270; HomoloGene: 12376; GeneCards: SPATS1; OMA:SPATS1 - orthologs

Gene location (Human)
Chr.	Chromosome 6 (human)
Band	6p21.1	Start	44,342,650 bp
Band	6p21.1	End	44,380,179 bp

Gene location (Mouse)
Chr.	Chromosome 17 (mouse)
Band	17|17 B3	Start	45,751,504 bp
Band	17|17 B3	End	45,786,341 bp
RNA expression pattern
Bgee	Human / Mouse (ortholog); Top expressed in: right uterine tube; gonad; left testis; right testis; testicle; olfactory zone of nasal mucosa; islet of Langerhans; muscle of thigh; right lung; prefrontal cortex / Top expressed in: spermatocyte; seminiferous tubule; lumbar subsegment of spinal cord; spermatid; morula; embryo; embryo; dentate gyrus of hippocampal formation granule cell; zygote; visual cortex; More reference expression data
BioGPS	n/a
Orthologs
Species	Human	Mouse
Entrez	221409	71020
Ensembl	ENSG00000249481	ENSMUSG00000023935
UniProt	Q496A3	A2RRY8
RefSeq (mRNA)	NM_145026; NM_001372081	NM_027649; NM_001357831; NM_001357832
RefSeq (protein)	NP_659463; NP_001359010	NP_081925; NP_001344760; NP_001344761
Location (UCSC)	Chr 6: 44.34 – 44.38 Mb	Chr 17: 45.75 – 45.79 Mb
PubMed search
- Wikidata
View/Edit Human	View/Edit Mouse

Spermatogenesis associated serine rich 1 (SPATS1) is a protein which in humans is encoded by the SPATS1 gene. It is also known by the aliases Dishevelled-DEP domain interacting protein (DDIP), Spermatogenesis Associated 8 (SPATA8), and serin-rich spermatogenic protein 1 (SRSP1). A general idea of its chemical structure, subcellular localization, expression, and conservation is known. Research suggests SPATS1 may play a role in the canonical Wnt Signaling pathway and in the first spermatogenic wave.

== Gene ==
The human SPATS1 gene contains 1150 nucleotides, coding for 300 amino acids. It's located on the positive strand of chromosome 6 in the 21p1 region. As of now there are no known single nucleotide polymorphisms (SNPs) that prove to be clinically significant.

== Protein ==
=== Structure ===
The protein in its longest form has 8 exons. There is another possible isoform, but experimental confirmation is lacking – possibly due to it being produced at low levels because of an immature stop codon. Bioinformatic analysis suggests that the protein does not have transmembrane structure and is composed of both alpha helixes and beta sheets. There have been conflicting numbers for SPATS1 isoelectric points. Several sources have said 6.68, while two others suggested that it is higher, 7.04 and 7.47.

=== Subcellular location ===
Studies have suggested that most of the expression is found in the cytoplasm of the cell, but there is also evidence of expression in the nucleus. Expression in the nucleus may be supported by the fact that the rat homolog of the SPATS1 gene was experimentally found to have a probable bipartite nuclear localization signal. In addition, bioinformatic tools have identified a bipartite nuclear localization signal with high probability in the human protein at amino acids 174 - 191.

=== Post-translational modifications ===
Bioinformatic analysis suggests that it undergoes several post-translational modifications. The more plausible ones propose a GPI – modification site at amino acid 280, N-glycosylation sites at amino acids 49 and 229, and a phosphorylation site at amino acid 113. There are 85 predicted sites of phosphorylation, 23 having an 80% or higher likelihood. Only the one located at amino acid 113 has been experimentally confirmed. There is also a high probability of a SASRP1 motif that spans amino acids 51 - 288.

=== Protein interactions ===
Possible interacting proteins are listed in the table below. Note that these proteins have not been experimentally confirmed to interact with SPATS1. Instead, their interaction potential was determined by looking

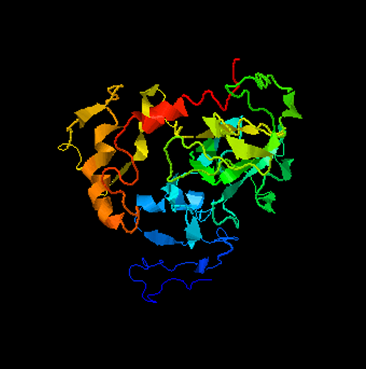
The image above is a predicted secondary structure of the SPATS1 protein. This prediction was generated using I-TASSER.

at concurrence patterns and textmining.

The image above is a schematic drawing of the SPATS1 protein. Green represents sites of N-Glycosylation, red represents experimentally confirmed sites of phosphorylation, yellow represents GPI - modification sites, the purple bar represents the Bipartite nuclear localization signal, and pink represents the SASRP1 motif.

Abbreviation	Protein Name	Function	Score
ZNF683	zinc finger protein 683	may be involved in transcriptional regulation	0.633
TMC5	transmembrane channel like 5	probable ion channel	0.624
GTSF1L	gametocyte specific factor 1 like	unknown	0.567
TMEM225	transmembrane protein 225	most likely inhibits phosphate 1 (PP1) in sperm via binding to catalytic sub-unit PPP1CC	0.566
SPATA3	spermatogenesis associated 3	unknown	0.537
FAM71F1	family with sequence similarity 71 member F1	unknown	0.535
C9orf139	chromosome 9 open reading frame 139	unknown	0.477
SPACA4	sperm acrosome associated 4	sperm surface membrane protein that may be involved in sperm - egg plasma membrane adhesion and fusion during fertilization	0.472
SCML4	sex comb on midleg-like protein 4	PcG proteins that act by forming multi-protein complexes, which are required to maintain the transcriptionally repressive state of homeotic genes throughout development	0.457

== Expression ==
=== Regulation ===
The expression of this protein has been found to greatly decline in adulthood, compared to expression levels measured in fetuses. Studies have shown some fluctuation during the gestation period, but overall remaining relatively high. There has also been evidence of high expression levels up until day 28 postpartum.

=== Location ===
Expression of this protein has been found in peritubular myoid cells, gonocytes, pachytene spermatocytes, spermatogonia, myoid cells, and Sertoli cells.

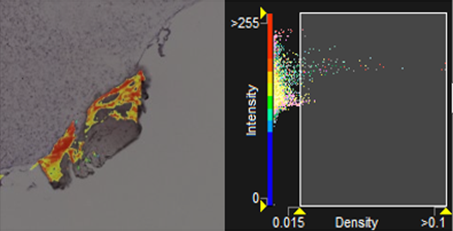
The image on the left represents a heat map of the expression levels of the SPATS1 protein in the pituitary gland. The picture on the right shows a scale for the color and shown and the coordinating expression level. These images were generated using Brain Allen.

Mouse brains have shown expression in various areas of the brain including the pituitary gland, the prefrontal cortex, the frontal lobe, the cerebellum, and the parietal lobe. Highest expression levels have been found in the testes, the next highest levels being found in the trachea. A protein abundance histogram, which compares the abundance of a desired protein to other proteins, shows that SPATS1 is on the lower level of expression.

== Function ==
The specific function of SPATS1 is still being studied. Research has indicated that it may play a role in initiation of the first spermatogenic wave as well as the first male meiotic division. Another study suggests that it acts as a negative regulator in the canonical Wnt signaling pathway. Several microaary studies have studied the effects of knocking out different proteins and enzymes and the resulting effects on SPATS1 expression. Epigentic factors, specifically histone methylation, have also been looked at. The effects of knockout on phenotypes have also been done in several studies.

== Conservation ==
SPATS1 protein is conserved in species as early as Oxytricha trifallax. No orthologues have been found for this protein in archaea or bacteria. Nor have orthologs been found in birds. There is a high level of conservation among mammals and other close orthologs in the coding region. There is conservation among distant orthologs in non-coding regions, including the promoter, 5' UTR, and 3' UTR. These conservations are kept through either the same nucleotide, or a chemically similar nucleotide. Below is a table of orthologs along with the percent similarity and their date of divergence.

Ortholog	Sequence Similarity to Homo sapiens	Sequence Identity to Homo sapiens	Date of Divergence (MYA)
Pongo abelii	95.70%	95.00%	15.2
Heterocephalus glaber	58.30%	52.00%	88
Pteropus alecto	71.30%	66.90%	94
Bos taurus	50.70%	47.70%	94
Bos mutus	64.10%	58.80%	94
Balaenoptera acutorostrata scammoni	80.30%	74.00%	94
Loxodonta africana	67.20%	61.00%	102
Sarcophilus harrisii	48.20%	37.50%	160
Ornithorhynchus anatinus	49.20%	39.90%	169
Gavialis gangeticus	45.40%	36.70%	320
Anolis carolinensis	48.30%	34.10%	320
Pelodiscus sinensis	45.90%	33.40%	320
Nanorana parkeri	43.10%	30.30%	353
Strongylocentrotus purpuratus	33.60%	25.60%	627
Nematostella vectensis	28.30%	25.20%	685
Branchiostoma belcheri	36.50%	29.20%	699
Crassostrea gigas	35.00%	27.00%	758
Lottia gigantea	32.70%	26.20%	758
Oxytricha trifallax	31.80%	20.40%	1781
