= DAB2 =

Human protein and coding gene

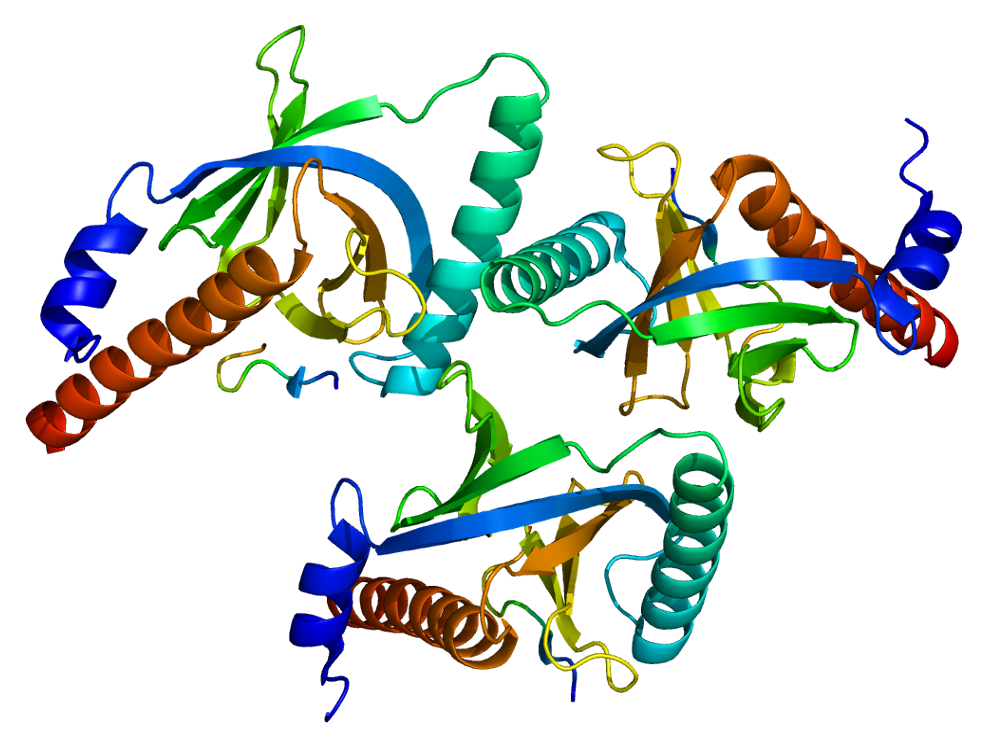
Available structures
PDB	Ortholog search: PDBe RCSB
PDB	List of PDB id codes 2LSW

Identifiers
- Aliases: DAB2, DOC-2, DOC2, clathrin adaptor protein, DAB adaptor protein 2
- External IDs: OMIM: 601236; MGI: 109175; HomoloGene: 1026; GeneCards: DAB2; OMA:DAB2 - orthologs

Gene location (Human)
Chr.	Chromosome 5 (human)
Band	5p13.1	Start	39,371,675 bp
Band	5p13.1	End	39,462,300 bp

Gene location (Mouse)
Chr.	Chromosome 15 (mouse)
Band	15 A1|15 2.15 cM	Start	6,329,269 bp
Band	15 A1|15 2.15 cM	End	6,470,193 bp
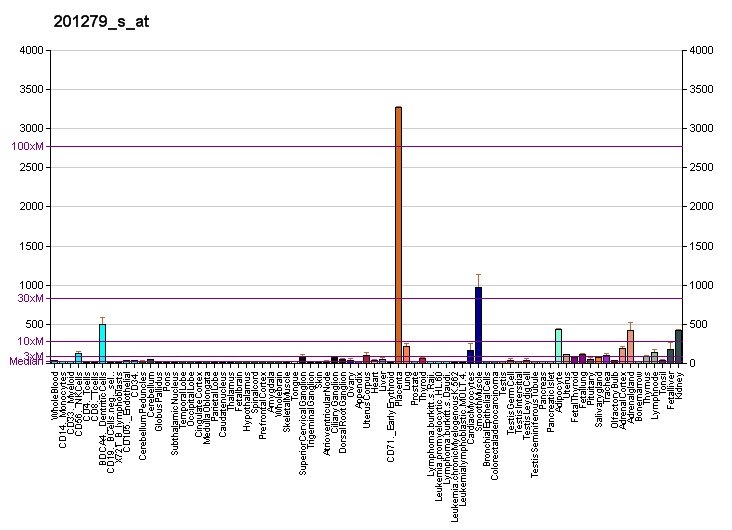

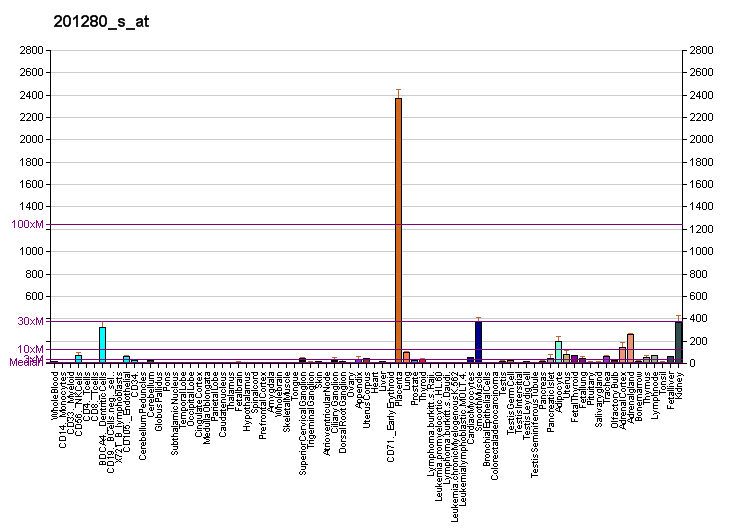

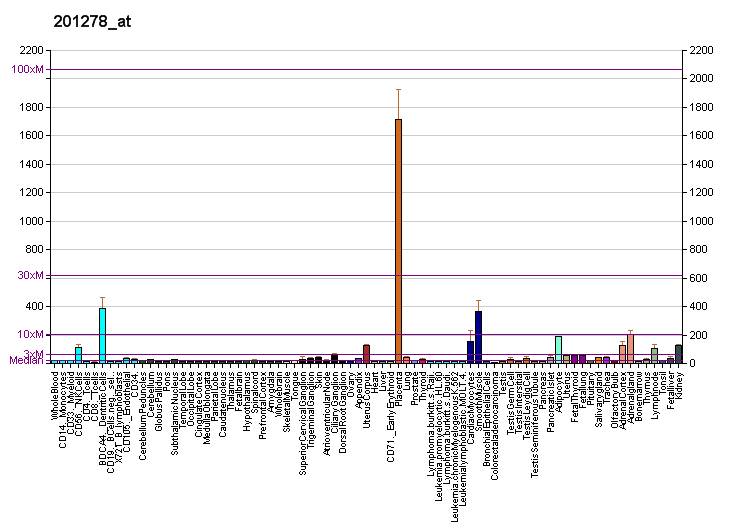
RNA expression pattern
Bgee	Human / Mouse (ortholog); Top expressed in: caput epididymis; corpus epididymis; tendon of biceps brachii; placenta; synovial joint; Achilles tendon; right adrenal cortex; human kidney; synovial membrane; left adrenal gland / Top expressed in: yolk sac; stroma of bone marrow; efferent ductule; right kidney; zygote; human kidney; dermis; adrenal gland; proximal tubule; secondary oocyte; More reference expression data
BioGPS	More reference expression data
Gene ontology
Molecular function	clathrin adaptor activity; protein C-terminus binding; protein binding; cargo receptor activity; SMAD binding
Cellular component	cytoplasm; intracellular membrane-bounded organelle; membrane; focal adhesion; plasma membrane; lysosomal membrane; nucleolus; clathrin-coated vesicle membrane; clathrin-coated pit; extracellular exosome; cytoplasmic vesicle; clathrin-coated vesicle; fibrillar center; cytosol
Biological process	positive regulation of transforming growth factor beta receptor signaling pathway; cell differentiation; positive regulation of protein phosphorylation; endocytosis; positive regulation of cell migration; positive regulation of pathway-restricted SMAD protein phosphorylation; negative regulation of androgen receptor signaling pathway; negative regulation of apoptotic process; Wnt signaling pathway; negative regulation of protein binding; positive regulation of epithelial to mesenchymal transition; leading edge cell differentiation; multicellular organism development; positive regulation of transcription, DNA-templated; positive regulation of endocytosis; negative regulation of protein localization to plasma membrane; positive regulation of clathrin-dependent endocytosis; protein transport; positive regulation of early endosome to late endosome transport; integrin-mediated signaling pathway; positive regulation of Wnt signaling pathway, planar cell polarity pathway; cell population proliferation; negative regulation of transcription, DNA-templated; negative regulation of canonical Wnt signaling pathway; positive regulation of proteasomal ubiquitin-dependent protein catabolic process; positive regulation of SMAD protein signal transduction; apoptotic process; receptor-mediated endocytosis; membrane organization; transport
Sources:Amigo / QuickGO
Orthologs
Species	Human	Mouse
Entrez	1601	13132
Ensembl	ENSG00000153071	ENSMUSG00000022150
UniProt	P98082	P98078
RefSeq (mRNA)	NM_001343; NM_001244871	NM_001008702; NM_001037905; NM_001102400; NM_023118; NM_001310446
RefSeq (protein)	NP_001231800; NP_001334	NP_001008702; NP_001032994; NP_001095870; NP_001297375; NP_075607
Location (UCSC)	Chr 5: 39.37 – 39.46 Mb	Chr 15: 6.33 – 6.47 Mb
PubMed search
- Wikidata
View/Edit Human	View/Edit Mouse

Disabled homolog 2 is a protein that in humans is encoded by the DAB2 gene.

== Function ==
DAB2 mRNA is expressed in normal ovarian epithelial cells but is down-regulated or absent from ovarian carcinoma cell lines. The 770-amino acid predicted protein has an overall 83% identity with the mouse p96 protein, a putative mitogen-responsive phosphoprotein; homology is strongest in the amino-terminal end of the protein in a region corresponding to the phosphotyrosine interaction domain. The down-regulation of DAB2 may play an important role in ovarian carcinogenesis. This gene was initially named DOC2 (for Differentially expressed in Ovarian Cancer) and is distinct from the DOC2A and DOC2B genes (for double C2-like domains, alpha and beta).

== Interactions ==
DAB2 has been shown to interact with:

- C-src tyrosine kinase,
- Cdk1,
- DAB2IP,
- DVL2,
- DVL3,
- LRP2,
- MYO6,
- Mothers against decapentaplegic homolog 2,
- Mothers against decapentaplegic homolog 3
- PIN1, and
- Src.
