= Farmer field school =

Process for promoting integrated pest management

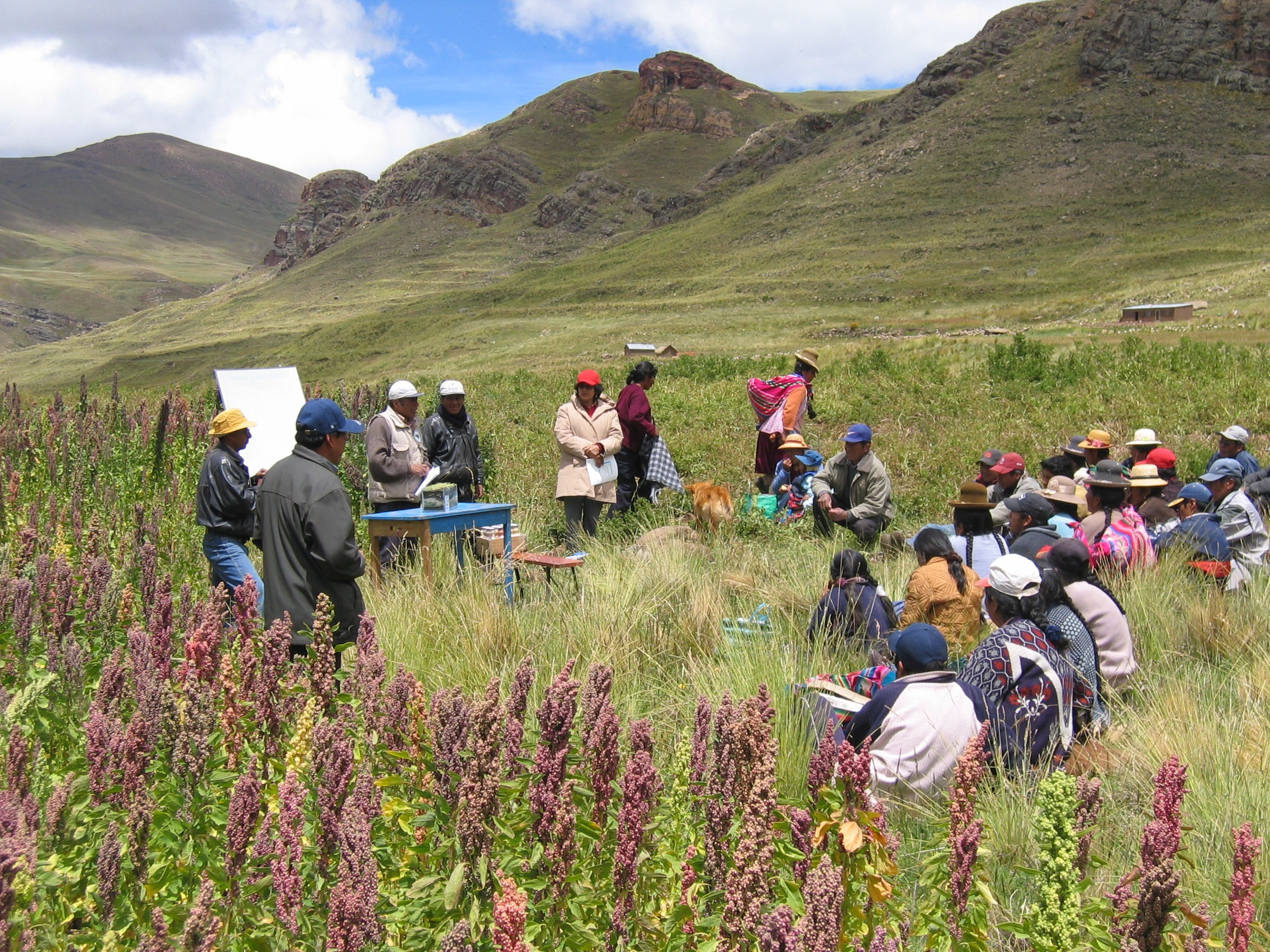
Farmer field school on crop husbandry and quinoa production, near Puno, Peru.

A farmer field school (FFS) is a group-based learning process which has been used by a number of governments, non-governmental organizations, and international agencies to promote integrated pest management (IPM). The first FFSs were designed and managed by the UN Food and Agriculture Organization in Indonesia in 1989. Since then, more than two million farmers across Asia have participated in this type of learning.

A farmer field school brings together concepts and methods from agroecology, experiential education and community development. As a result, hundreds of thousands of rice farmers in countries such as China, India, Indonesia, Philippines and Vietnam have been able to reduce the use of pesticides and improve the sustainability of crop yields. FFSs have also produced other developmental benefits that are broadly described as 'empowerment': FFS alumni in a number of countries are involved in a wide range of self-directed activities including research, training, marketing, and advocacy.

== Origins ==
Almost one third of the world's population are members of farming households in Asia. Most of these farming families are small holders. Forty years ago, the Green Revolution was launched with the aim of improving the productivity of small farmers. By improving access to water, improved varieties, and other inputs, the Green Revolution helped to double average rice yields between the 1960s and the 1990s.

During the 1970s it became increasingly apparent that pest resistance and resurgence caused by the indiscriminate use of insecticides posed an immediate threat to the gains of the Green Revolution. At the same time, research was being conducted that demonstrated the viability of biological control of major rice pests. However, gaps still existed between the science generated in research institutions and common farmer practice conditioned by years of aggressive promotion of pesticide use. Over the ensuing years, a number of approaches were tried to bring integrated pest management (IPM) to small farmers - particularly rice farmers – in Asia, with mixed results. Some experts claimed that the principles of IPM were too complex for small farmers to master, and that centrally designed messages were still the only way to convince farmers to change their practices.

By the end of the 1980s, a new approach to farmer training emerged in Indonesia called the 'Farmer Field School' (FFS). The broad problem which these field schools were designed to address was a lack of knowledge among Asian farmers relating to agroecology, particularly the relationship between insect pests and beneficial insects.

The implementation of projects using the FFS approach led to a deeper understanding of the problem and its causes. It was recognised that sustainable agricultural development required more than just the acquisition of ecological knowledge by individual farmers. It also required the development of a capability for generating, adapting and extending this knowledge within farming communities. The weakness of this capability in most farming communities is itself an important problem; one which has often been exacerbated by earlier agricultural development programmes that fostered a dependency on external sources of expertise.

This deeper understanding of the problem was first recognised by farmers in Indonesia who graduated from FFS but realised there was more they could do to improve rural livelihoods. They started to organise new groups, alliances, networks and associations, and became involved in planning and implementing their own interventions. These interventions were highly diverse, ranging from research and training, to marketing and advocacy work. In response to the activities of these groups, IPM projects started to support the idea of 'Community IPM', which gave considerable attention to organisational issues rather than focussing solely on technological and educational aspects of IPM.

== Description ==
A farmer field school (FFS) is a group-based learning process. During an FFS, farmers carried out experiential learning activities that helped them understand the ecology of their rice fields. These activities involve simple experiments, regular field observations and group analysis. The knowledge gained from these activities enables participants to make their own locally specific decisions about crop management practices. This approach represents a radical departure from earlier agricultural extension programmes, in which farmers were expected to adopt generalized recommendations that had been formulated by specialists from outside the community.

The basic features of a typical rice IPM Farmer Field School are as follows:

- The IPM Field School is field based and lasts for a full cropping season.
- A rice FFS meets once a week with a total number of meetings that might range from at least 10 up to 16 meetings.
- The primary learning material at a Farmers Field School is the rice field.
- The Field School meeting place is close to the learning plots often in a farmer's home and sometimes beneath a convenient tree.
- FFS educational methods are experiential, participatory, and learner centred.
- Each FFS meeting includes at least three activities: the agro-ecosystem analysis, a "special topic", and a group dynamics activity.
- In every FFS, participants conduct a study comparing IPM with non-IPM treated plots.
- An FFS often includes several additional field studies depending on local field problems.
- Between 25 and 30 farmers participate in a FFS. Participants learn together in small groups of five to maximise participation.
- All FFSs include a Field Day in which farmers make presentations about IPM and the results of their studies.
- A pre- and post-test is conducted as part of every Field School for diagnostic purposes and for determining follow-up activities.
- The facilitators of FFS's undergo intensive season-long residential training to prepare them for organising and conducting Field Schools.
- Preparation meetings precede an FFS to determine needs, recruit participants, and develop a learning contract.
- Final meetings of the FFS often include planning for follow-up activities.

Although Farmer Field Schools were designed to promote IPM, empowerment has an essential feature from the beginning. The curriculum of the FFS was built on the assumption that farmers could only implement IPM once they had acquired the ability to carry out their own analysis, make their own decisions and organise their own activities. The empowerment process, rather than the adoption of specific IPM techniques, is what produces many of the developmental benefits of the FFS

== FAO support in Asia ==
The first IPM Farmer Field Schools were designed and managed in 1989 by experts working for the UN Food and Agriculture Organization (FAO) in Indonesia. This was not, however, the first attempt made by FAO to extend IPM techniques to farmers in South East Asia.

The FAO Intercountry Programme for the Development and Application of Integrated Pest Control in Rice in South and South-East Asia started in 1980, building on the experience of the International Rice Research Institute (IRRI) and Bureau of Plant Industry in the Philippines. Over the following two decades the Intercountry Programme (ICP) played a leading role in the promotion of rice IPM in Asia, giving rise to numerous other projects and programmes. By the time of completion in 2002, the ICP had a cumulative budget of $45 million, which had been spent on training activities in 12 countries (Bangladesh, Cambodia, China, India, Indonesia, Laos, Malaysia, Nepal, Philippines, Sri Lanka, Thailand, Vietnam).

The ICP was not the only IPM programme supported by FAO during this period. Essential to the development of the FFS was a National IPM Programme in Indonesia, which ran between 1989 and 2000, funded by the United States ($ 25 million grant), World Bank ($ 37 million loan) and the Government ($ 14 million). FAO provided technical assistance to the National IPM Programme through a team of experts based in Indonesia, with back-stopping from the ICP. National projects were also developed and supported by FAO on a smaller scale in Bangladesh, Cambodia, China and Nepal. Additionally, the ICP launched 'spin-off' regional programmes focusing on IPM in cotton and vegetables. In total, during the 15-year period between 1989 and 2004, approximately $100 million in grants were allocated to IPM projects in Asia that used the FFS approach under the guidance of FAO

== Costs and benefits ==
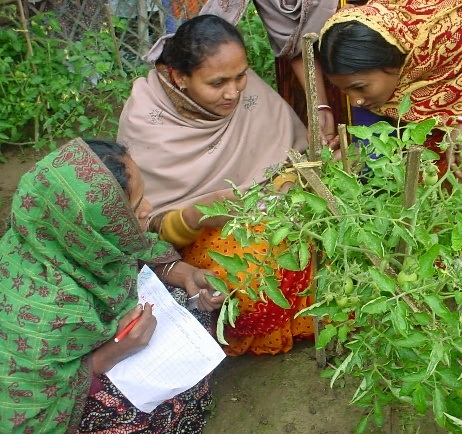
Homestead vegetable producers attending FFS in Bangladesh, 2004, organised by CARE

There are two major reasons why it is difficult to make generalisations about the costs and benefits of IPM field schools.

Firstly, there is a lack of agreement about what factors should be taken into account on both sides of the cost-benefit equation. Regarding benefits, should we limit ourselves to measuring yields and pesticide savings, or should we also take account of improvements in public health and the consequences of farmers becoming better organised? Regarding costs, should we limit ourselves to the expenses involved in running field schools, or should we also take account of the wider costs of training extension staff and managing IPM programmes.

Secondly, there is a high degree of variation in the value of individual factors. The cost of conducting a season-long field school for 25 farmers has ranged from $150 to $1,000 depending on the country and the organisation. In some cases, the graduates of FFS have saved $40 per hectare per season by eliminating pesticides without any loss of yield. In other cases, graduates did not experience any savings because they were not previously using any pesticides, but yields increased by as much as 25% as a result of adopting other practices learnt during the FFS, such as improved varieties, better water management and enhanced plant nutrition.

The conceptual and methodological problems associated with assessing the impact of IPM field schools have resulted in disagreements among experts about the advantages of this intervention . One widely circulated paper written by World Bank economists has questioned the benefit of 'sending farmers back to school'. By contrast, a meta-analysis of 25 impact studies commissioned by FAO concluded:

The majority of studies ... reported substantial and consistent reductions in pesticide use attributable to the effect of training. In a number of cases, there was also a convincing increase in yield due to training. ... A number of studies described broader, developmental impacts of training. ... Results demonstrated remarkable, widespread and lasting developmental impacts. It was found that the FFS stimulated continued learning, and that it strengthened social and political skills, which apparently prompted a range of local activities, relationships and policies related to improved agro-ecosystem management.

Despite the arguments amongst economists and policy makers, there has been widespread enthusiasm for IPM and FFS among farmers and development practitioners in a number of Asian countries. Participation in FFS has always been voluntary, and none of the IPM projects and programmes supported by FAO provided financial incentives to participants. On the contrary, participation in FFS has always involved a considerable cost in terms of time and effort. Despite these costs, two million farmers decided to participate. In most countries, the demand for places on a field school has been ahead of supply, and drop-out rates have been very low. Furthermore, there are many examples of farmers who decided to train other members of their community and continue working as a group after the training came to an end.

== See also ==
- Constructivism (learning theory)
- Organic farming
- Sustainable development
