= DVL1 =

Human protein and coding gene

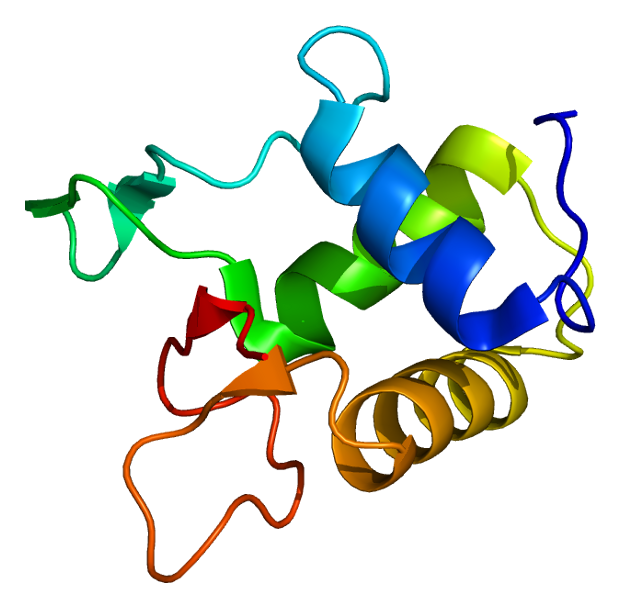

Identifiers
- Aliases: DVL1, DVL, DVL1L1, DVL1P1, DRS2, dishevelled segment polarity protein 1
- External IDs: OMIM: 601365; MGI: 94941; GeneCards: DVL1
Available structures
PDB	Ortholog search: PDBe RCSB
PDB	List of PDB id codes 1FSH, 1MC7, 2KAW, 3PZ8

Gene location (Human)
Chr.	Chromosome 1 (human)
Band	1p36.33	Start	1,335,276 bp
Band	1p36.33	End	1,349,418 bp

Gene location (Mouse)
Chr.	Chromosome 4 (mouse)
Band	4 E2|4 87.61 cM	Start	155,931,859 bp
Band	4 E2|4 87.61 cM	End	155,943,760 bp
RNA expression pattern
Bgee	Human / Mouse (ortholog); Top expressed in: muscle of thigh; gastrocnemius muscle; Skeletal muscle tissue of rectus abdominis; apex of heart; right frontal lobe; pancreatic ductal cell; body of tongue; thoracic diaphragm; amygdala; right hemisphere of cerebellum / Top expressed in: medullary collecting duct; Paneth cell; renal corpuscle; substantia nigra; barrel cortex; Rostral migratory stream; motor neuron; vastus lateralis muscle; ascending aorta; fossa; More reference expression data
BioGPS	n/a
Gene ontology
Molecular function	beta-catenin binding; frizzled binding; protein binding; identical protein binding; enzyme binding; protein kinase binding
Cellular component	cytoplasm; cytosol; Wnt signalosome; lateral plasma membrane; membrane; microtubule cytoskeleton; growth cone; plasma membrane; synapse; axon; soma; dendrite; neuron projection; microtubule; clathrin-coated vesicle; presynapse; dendritic spine; postsynaptic density; cytoplasmic vesicle; Schaffer collateral - CA1 synapse; glutamatergic synapse
Biological process	regulation of protein phosphorylation; negative regulation of protein phosphorylation; regulation of neurotransmitter levels; positive regulation of protein phosphorylation; intracellular signal transduction; axonogenesis; negative regulation of protein kinase activity; dendrite morphogenesis; synapse organization; protein stabilization; Wnt signaling pathway; transcription by RNA polymerase II; negative regulation of protein binding; receptor clustering; planar cell polarity pathway involved in neural tube closure; axon guidance; positive regulation of transcription, DNA-templated; positive regulation of Wnt signaling pathway; multicellular organism development; Wnt signaling pathway, planar cell polarity pathway; protein localization to microtubule; neuromuscular junction development; cochlea morphogenesis; neural tube development; cytoplasmic microtubule organization; positive regulation of neuron projection development; axon extension; protein localization to nucleus; canonical Wnt signaling pathway; social behavior; skeletal muscle acetylcholine-gated channel clustering; collateral sprouting; convergent extension involved in neural plate elongation; negative regulation of canonical Wnt signaling pathway; neurotransmitter secretion; positive regulation of proteasomal ubiquitin-dependent protein catabolic process; convergent extension involved in organogenesis; prepulse inhibition; positive regulation of canonical Wnt signaling pathway; beta-catenin destruction complex disassembly; dendritic spine morphogenesis; positive regulation of excitatory postsynaptic potential; presynapse assembly; positive regulation of protein localization to presynapse; non-canonical Wnt signaling pathway; postsynapse organization; positive regulation of neuron projection arborization; regulation of synaptic vesicle exocytosis
Sources:Amigo / QuickGO
Orthologs
Databases	NCBI: entry; OMA: entry
Species	Human	Mouse
Entrez	1855	13542
Ensembl	ENSG00000107404	ENSMUSG00000029071
UniProt	O14640	P51141
RefSeq (mRNA)	NM_004421; NM_181870; NM_182779; NM_001330311	NM_010091; NM_001302342; NM_001356381
RefSeq (protein)	NP_001317240; NP_004412	NP_034221; NP_001343310
Location (UCSC)	Chr 1: 1.34 – 1.35 Mb	Chr 4: 155.93 – 155.94 Mb
PubMed search
- Wikidata
View/Edit Human	View/Edit Mouse

Segment polarity protein dishevelled homolog DVL-1 is a protein that in humans is encoded by the DVL1 gene.

== Function ==
DVL1, the human homolog of the Drosophila dishevelled gene (dsh), encodes a cytoplasmic phosphoprotein that regulates cell proliferation, acting as a transducer molecule for developmental processes, including segmentation and neuroblast specification. DVL1 is a candidate gene for processes involved in cell transformations involved in neuroblastoma. The Schwartz–Jampel syndrome and Charcot–Marie–Tooth disease type 2A have been mapped to the same region as DVL1. The phenotypes of these diseases may be consistent with defects which might be expected from aberrant expression of a DVL gene during development. Three transcript variants encoding three different isoforms have been found for this gene.

== Interactions ==
DVL1 has been shown to interact with:

- AXIN1,
- DVL3,
- EPS8, and
- Mothers against decapentaplegic homolog 3.

== See also ==
- Dishevelled
