= DVL2 =

Human protein and coding gene

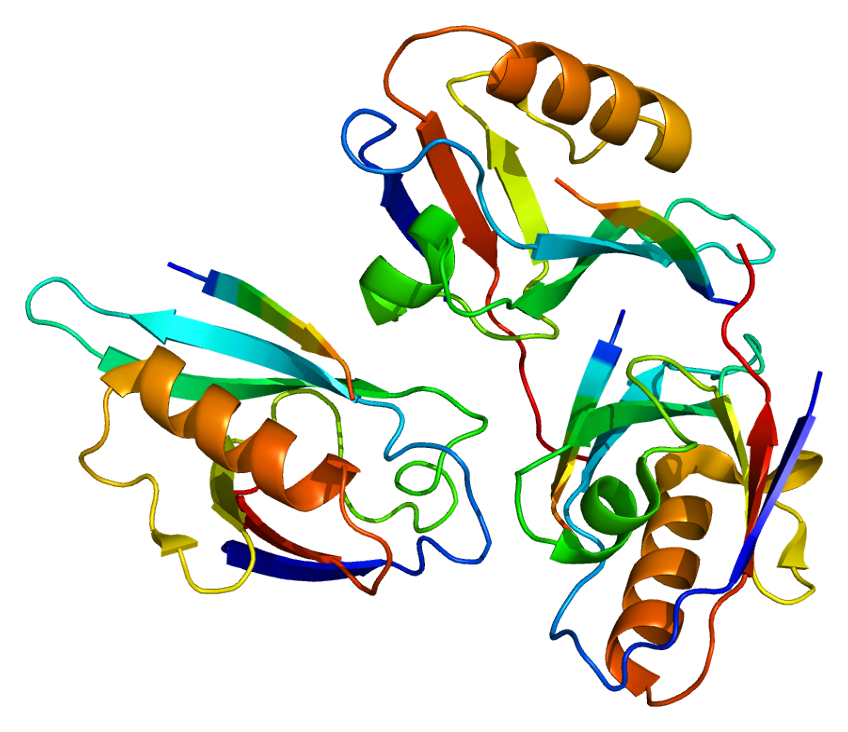

Identifiers
- Aliases: DVL2, dishevelled segment polarity protein 2
- External IDs: OMIM: 602151; MGI: 106613; GeneCards: DVL2
Available structures
| PDB | Ortholog search: PDBe RCSB |
| PDB | List of PDB id codes 2REY, 3CBX, 3CBY, 3CBZ, 3CC0, 4WIP |

Gene location (Human)
| Chr. | Chromosome 17 (human) |
| Band | 17p13.1 | Start | 7,225,342 bp |
| Band | 17p13.1 | End | 7,234,517 bp |

Gene location (Mouse)
| Chr. | Chromosome 11 (mouse) |
| Band | 11 B3|11 42.96 cM | Start | 69,891,421 bp |
| Band | 11 B3|11 42.96 cM | End | 69,903,127 bp |
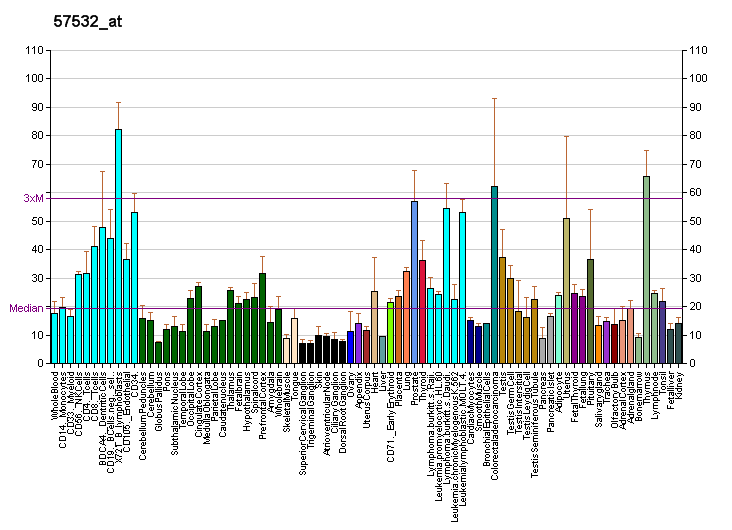

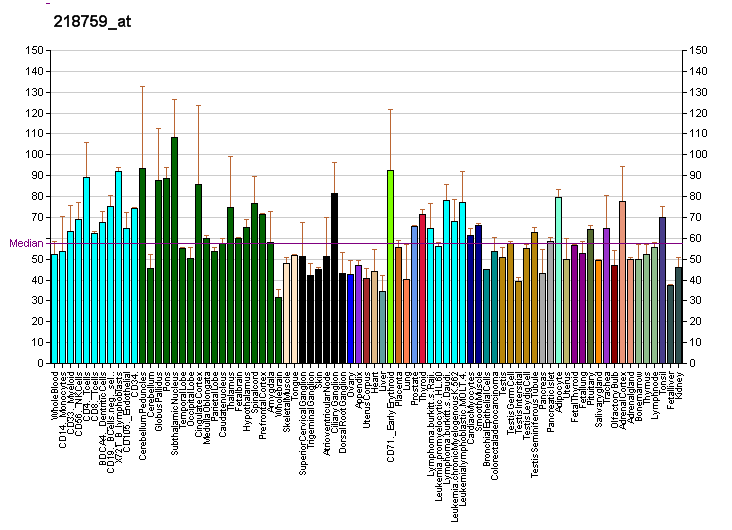
RNA expression pattern
| Bgee | Human / Mouse (ortholog); Top expressed in: ventricular zone; stromal cell of endometrium; left ovary; ectocervix; right ovary; body of uterus; right hemisphere of cerebellum; canal of the cervix; anterior pituitary; ganglionic eminence / Top expressed in: yolk sac; ventricular zone; granulocyte; epiblast; superior frontal gyrus; neural layer of retina; spermatocyte; genital tubercle; tail of embryo; dermis; More reference expression data |
| BioGPS | More reference expression data |
Gene ontology
| Molecular function | protein-macromolecule adaptor activity; protein domain specific binding; frizzled binding; protein self-association; protein binding; identical protein binding; protein kinase binding |
| Cellular component | membrane; clathrin-coated endocytic vesicle; plasma membrane; apical part of cell; clathrin-coated vesicle; cytoplasm; cytoplasmic vesicle; nucleus; cytosol; nucleoplasm; aggresome; lateral plasma membrane; nuclear body |
| Biological process | non-canonical Wnt signaling pathway; positive regulation of protein phosphorylation; intracellular signal transduction; positive regulation of protein tyrosine kinase activity; heart morphogenesis; canonical Wnt signaling pathway involved in regulation of cell proliferation; positive regulation of DNA-binding transcription factor activity; transcription by RNA polymerase II; hippo signaling; positive regulation of transcription, DNA-templated; multicellular organism development; positive regulation of GTPase activity; protein complex oligomerization; cochlea morphogenesis; convergent extension involved in neural plate elongation; negative regulation of canonical Wnt signaling pathway; segmentation; convergent extension involved in organogenesis; positive regulation of canonical Wnt signaling pathway; neural tube closure; development of the heart; Wnt signaling pathway; outflow tract morphogenesis; canonical Wnt signaling pathway; segment specification; positive regulation of JUN kinase activity; planar cell polarity pathway involved in neural tube closure; Wnt signaling pathway, planar cell polarity pathway; beta-catenin destruction complex disassembly; membrane organization; positive regulation of neuron projection arborization |
Sources:Amigo / QuickGO
Orthologs
| Databases | NCBI: entry; OMA: entry |
| Species | Human | Mouse |
| Entrez | 1856 | 13543 |
| Ensembl | ENSG00000004975 | ENSMUSG00000020888 |
| UniProt | O14641 | Q60838 |
| RefSeq (mRNA) | NM_004422 | NM_007888 |
| RefSeq (protein) | NP_004413 | NP_031914 |
| Location (UCSC) | Chr 17: 7.23 – 7.23 Mb | Chr 11: 69.89 – 69.9 Mb |
| PubMed search |
- Wikidata
| View/Edit Human | View/Edit Mouse |

Segment polarity protein dishevelled homolog DVL-2 is a protein that in humans is encoded by the DVL2 gene.

This gene encodes a member of the dishevelled (dsh) protein family. The vertebrate dsh proteins have approximately 40% amino acid sequence similarity with Drosophila dsh. This gene encodes a 90-kD protein that undergoes posttranslational phosphorylation to form a 95-kD cytoplasmic protein, which may play a role in the signal transduction pathway mediated by multiple Wnt proteins. The mechanisms of dishevelled function in Wnt signaling are likely to be conserved among metazoans.

== Interactions ==
DVL2 has been shown to interact with Zinc finger protein 165, DAB2 and Arrestin beta 1.

== See also ==
- Dishevelled
