= DVL3 =

Protein-coding gene in humans

Identifiers
- Aliases: DVL3, DRS3, dishevelled segment polarity protein 3
- External IDs: OMIM: 601368; MGI: 108100; GeneCards: DVL3

Gene location (Human)
Chr.	Chromosome 3 (human)
Band	3q27.1	Start	184,155,377 bp
Band	3q27.1	End	184,173,614 bp

Gene location (Mouse)
Chr.	Chromosome 16 (mouse)
Band	16 A3|16 12.46 cM	Start	20,335,732 bp
Band	16 A3|16 12.46 cM	End	20,352,760 bp
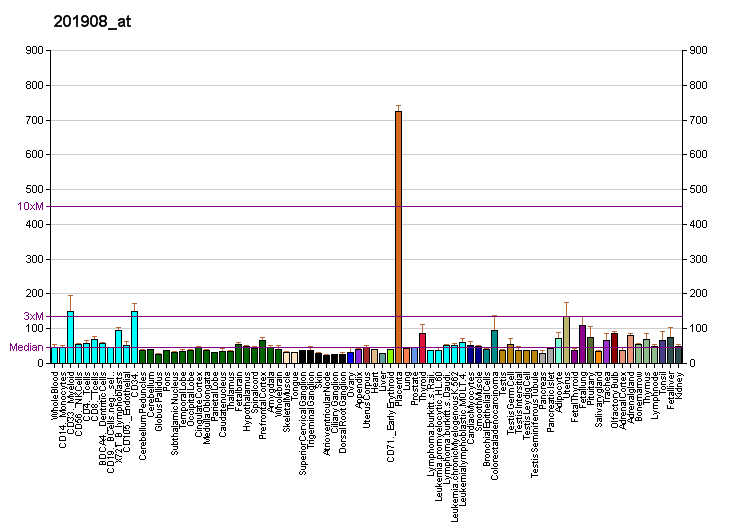
RNA expression pattern
Bgee	Human / Mouse (ortholog); Top expressed in: stromal cell of endometrium; ganglionic eminence; gastric mucosa; muscle layer of sigmoid colon; body of uterus; apex of heart; sural nerve; right ovary; left uterine tube; left ovary / Top expressed in: cardiac muscle tissue of left ventricle; external carotid artery; internal carotid artery; genital tubercle; choroid plexus of fourth ventricle; trigeminal ganglion; tail of embryo; molar; ventricular zone; zygote; More reference expression data
BioGPS	More reference expression data
Gene ontology
Molecular function	beta-catenin binding; frizzled binding; protease binding; protein binding; protein heterodimerization activity; signaling receptor binding
Cellular component	cytoplasm; cytosol
Biological process	positive regulation of protein phosphorylation; intracellular signal transduction; positive regulation of JUN kinase activity; protein stabilization; Wnt signaling pathway; positive regulation of transcription, DNA-templated; multicellular organism development; positive regulation of GTPase activity; negative regulation of canonical Wnt signaling pathway; beta-catenin destruction complex disassembly; non-canonical Wnt signaling pathway; non-canonical Wnt signaling pathway via JNK cascade; canonical Wnt signaling pathway; Wnt signaling pathway, planar cell polarity pathway; planar cell polarity pathway involved in neural tube closure; positive regulation of neuron projection arborization
Sources:Amigo / QuickGO
Orthologs
Databases	NCBI: entry; OMA: entry
Species	Human	Mouse
Entrez	1857	13544
Ensembl	ENSG00000161202	ENSMUSG00000003233
UniProt	Q92997	Q61062
RefSeq (mRNA)	NM_004423	NM_007889; NM_001347176
RefSeq (protein)	NP_004414	NP_001334105; NP_031915
Location (UCSC)	Chr 3: 184.16 – 184.17 Mb	Chr 16: 20.34 – 20.35 Mb
PubMed search
- Wikidata
View/Edit Human	View/Edit Mouse

Segment polarity protein dishevelled homolog DVL-3 is a protein that in humans is encoded by the DVL3 gene.

This gene is a member of a multi-gene family which shares strong similarity with the Drosophila dishevelled gene, dsh. The Drosophila dishevelled gene encodes a cytoplasmic phosphoprotein that regulates cell proliferation.

== Interactions ==
DVL3 has been shown to interact with DAB2, DVL1 and PRPF3.

== See also ==
- Dishevelled
