= Participatory development =

Engagement of local populations in development projects

Participatory development (PD) seeks to engage local populations in development projects. Participatory development has taken a variety of forms since it emerged in the 1970s, when it was introduced as an important part of the "basic needs approach" to development. Most manifestations of public participation in development seek "to give the poor a part in initiatives designed for their benefit" in the hopes that development projects will be more sustainable and successful if local populations are engaged in the development process. PD has become an increasingly accepted method of development practice and is employed by a variety of organizations. It is often presented as an alternative to mainstream "top-down" development. There is some question about the proper definition of PD as it varies depending on the perspective applied.

== Perspectives ==
Two perspectives that can define PD are the "Social Movement Perspective" and the "Institutional Perspective":

You cannot "buy" development; beneficiary communities must own the projects - B.Hoeper

The "Social Movement Perspective" defines participation as the mobilization of people to eliminate unjust hierarchies of knowledge, power, and economic distribution. This perspective identifies the goal of participation as an empowering process for people to handle challenges and influence the direction of their own lives. Empowerment participation is when primary stakeholders are capable and willing to initiate the process and take part in the analysis. This leads to joint decision making about what should be achieved and how. While outsiders are equal partners in the development effort, the primary stakeholders are primus inter pares, i.e., they are equal partners with a significant say in decisions concerning their lives. Dialogue identifies and analyzes critical issues, and an exchange of knowledge and experiences leads to solutions. Ownership and control of the process rest in the hands of the primary stakeholders.

The "Institutional Perspective" defines participation as the reach and inclusion of inputs by relevant groups in the design and implementation of a development project. The "Institutional Perspective" uses the inputs and opinions of relevant groups, or stakeholders in a community, as a tool to achieve a pre-established goal defined by someone external to the community involved. The development project, initiated by an activist external to the community involved, is a process by which problem issues in a community can be divided into stages, and this division facilitates assessment of when and to what degree a participatory approach is relevant. From an institutional perspective, there are four key stages of a development project: Research Stage, Design Stage, Implementation Stage, Evaluation Stage that are defined in later sections of this article. The institutional perspective can also be referred to as a "Project-Based Perspective".

Advocates of PD emphasize a difference between participation as "an end in itself", and participatory development as a "process of empowerment" for marginalized populations. This has also been described as the contrast between valuing participation for intrinsic rather than purely instrumental reasons. In the former manifestation, participants may be asked to give opinions without any assurance that these opinions will have an effect or may be informed of decisions after they have been made. In the latter form, proponents assert that PD tries to "foster and enhance people's capability to have a role in their society's development".

Participatory development employed in particular initiatives often involves the process of content creation. For example, UNESCO's Finding a Voice Project employs ICT for development initiatives. Local content creation and distribution contributes to the formation of local information networks. This is a bottom-up approach that involves extensive discussions, conversations, and decision-making with the target community. Community group members create content according to their capacities and interests. This process facilitates engagement with information and communication technology (ICT) with the goal of strengthening individual and social development. This participatory content creation is an important tool for poverty reduction strategies and creating a digitally inclusive knowledge society.

== Stages of a participatory development project from an institutional perspective ==
In a democracy we need a participated approach to development - Ahluwalia

Each project issue in participatory development can be divided into stages, and this division facilitates assessment of when and to what degree a participatory approach is relevant. From an institutional perspective, there are four key stages of a development project:

- Research Stage is where the development problem is accurately defined. All relevant stakeholders can be involved in this process. The research around the development problem can include studying previous experiences, individual and community knowledge and attitudes, existing policies and other relevant contextual information related to socio-economic conditions, culture, spirituality, gender, etc.
- Design Stage defines the actual activities. A participatory approach helps to secure the ownership and commitment of the communities involved. Active participation by local citizens and other stakeholders aims to enhance both the quality and relevance of the suggested interventions.
- Implementation Stage is when the planned intervention is implemented. Participation at this stage increases commitment, relevance and sustainability.
- Evaluation Stage participation ensures that the most significant changes are voiced, brought to common attention and assessed. For a meaningful evaluation, indicators and measurements should be defined in a participatory process at the very beginning of the initiative involving all relevant stakeholders.

== Features of participatory development ==
- Passive participation is the least participatory of the four approaches. Primary stakeholders of a project participate by being informed about what is going to happen or has already happened. People’s feedback is minimal or non- existent, and their participation is assessed through methods like head counting and contribution to the discussion (sometimes referred to as participation by information).
- Participation by consultation is an extractive process, whereby stakeholders provide answers to questions posed by outside researchers or experts. Input is not limited to meetings but can be provided at different points in time. In the final analysis, however, this consultative process keeps all the decision- making power in the hands of external professionals who are under no obligation to incorporate stakeholders' input.
- Participation by collaboration forms groups of primary stakeholders to participate in the discussion and analysis of predetermined objectives set by the project. This level of participation does not usually result in dramatic changes in what should be accomplished, which is often already determined. It does, however, require an active involvement in the decision-making process about how to achieve it. This incorporates a component of horizontal communication and capacity building among all stakeholders—a joint collaborative effort. Even if initially dependent on outside facilitators and experts, with time collaborative participation has the potential to evolve into an independent form of participation.
- Empowerment participation is where primary stakeholders are capable and willing to initiate the process and take part in the analysis. This leads to joint decision making about what should be achieved and how. While outsiders are equal partners in the development effort, the primary stakeholders are primus inter pares, i.e., they are equal partners with a significant say in decisions concerning their lives. Dialogue identifies and analyzes critical issues, and an exchange of knowledge and experiences leads to solutions. Ownership and control of the process rest in the hands of the primary stakeholders.

== Variations of participatory development ==
=== Manifestations ===
There are many different manifestations of Participatory Development. PD has been promoted as a way to improve the "efficiency and effectiveness" of "formal" development programs. This method usually involves external and local actors working together on a particular project. GTZ (Deutsche Gesellschaft für Technische Zusammenarbeit), a German development agency, describes participation as "co-determination and power sharing throughout the program cycle". By involving those who will benefit from the programs in their development and having local and international groups work together, it is hoped that development projects will be made more sustainable and successful.

Enabling "mutual learning" is another way that PD is conceptualized. The goal is to enhance "communication, respect, listening and learning between development workers and those they serve" in order to achieve more applicable, "useful outcomes". Participatory Rural Appraisal (PRA) is one example of mutual learning, a form of research which acknowledges that "illiterate, poor, marginalized people [can] represent their own lives and livelihoods ... do their own analysis and come up with their own solutions".

Some hope that PD will be able to cause a shift in power relations by "valorizing ... voices" that usually go unheard by political and development groups. This speaks to the idea that PD has the potential to increase a population's ability to be self-determining. Those who promote this view of PD would like to see local communities making, rather than only contributing to, important decisions. These activists hope that PD will lead to better civil engagement, whereby people are able determine the ways their own communities function. In these cases, international organizations can support and draw attention to the efforts of groups working for self-determination.

=== Implementation ===
Some theorists have highlighted a difference between "invited" and "claimed" spaces for PD. Invited spaces are usually formal events where local communities are asked by development agencies to share their thoughts. There is often a goal of coming to an agreement. Conversely, claimed spaces are created when marginalized individuals step in and "[take] control of political processes". The Zapatista Army of National Liberation movement can be viewed as an example of local people "claiming" space to advocate for political change.

== Benefits ==
Research conducted by several development agencies (World Bank, CIDA, USAID, IRDP) suggests that there are many benefits to be gained through the use of PD. These studies suggest that while PD projects may have high start up costs, they will be less expensive and more sustainable in the long run. These studies also found that PD projects are better at addressing local needs and are generally more relevant to local populations than traditional development projects.

Community participation is also thought to increase the efficiency of development projects. Participation can also contribute towards more equitable outcomes so long as elite capture of participatory mechanisms is avoided.

== Criticisms ==
When compared with traditional forms of development, PD is sometimes criticized for being costly and slow. A project may take longer if one has to engage, work and come to a consensus with local communities, than if one did not have to do these things. PD may also have higher start-up costs than traditional development. In addition, PD is criticized for reaching a smaller population than traditional development. Community dialogue and augmentation may initially involve only a few individuals, whereas dropped food aid reaches hundreds of people.

== See also ==
Barrio Rafael Uribe Uribe

- Progress in Community Health Partnerships: Research, Education, and Action (PCHP)
- Participatory action research
- Participatory technology development
- Participation (decision making)
- Farmer Field School
- Community-led total sanitation
- Community-based participatory research (CBPR)
- Asset-Based Community Development (ABCD)
- Praxis intervention
- Public participation
- Orality
- Millennium Development Goals
- Wikipedia:WikiProject International development
- Development_Cooperation_Handbook/The_participatory_approach at Wikibooks
