= Participatory rural appraisal =

Process in international development

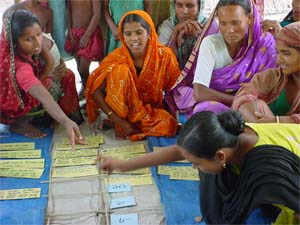
PRA ranking exercise being carried out by members of a Farmer Field School in Bangladesh, 2004

Participatory rural appraisal (PRA) is an approach used by non-governmental organizations (NGOs) and other agencies involved in international development. The approach aims to incorporate the knowledge and opinions of rural people in the planning and management of development projects and programmes.

== Origins ==
The philosophical roots of participatory rural appraisal techniques can be traced to activist adult education methods such as those of Paulo Freire and the study clubs of the Antigonish Movement. In this view, an actively involved and empowered local population is essential to successful rural community development. Robert Chambers, a key exponent of PRA, argued that the approach owes much to "the Freirian theme, that poor and exploited people can and should be enabled to analyze their own reality."

By the early 1980s, there was growing dissatisfaction among development experts with both the reductionism of formal surveys, and the biases of typical field visits. In 1983, Robert Chambers, a Fellow at the Institute of Development Studies (UK), used the term rapid rural appraisal (RRA) to describe techniques that could bring about a "reversal of learning", to learn from rural people directly. Two years later, the first international conference to share experiences relating to RRA was held in Thailand. This was followed by a rapid acceptance of usage of methods that involved rural people in examining their own problems, setting their own goals, and monitoring their own achievements. By the mid-1990s, the term RRA had been replaced by a number of other terms including participatory rural appraisal (PRA) and participatory learning and action (PLA).

Robert Chambers acknowledged that the significant breakthroughs and innovations that informed the methodology came from community development practitioners in Africa, India and elsewhere. Chambers helped PRA gain acceptance among practitioners. Chambers explained the function of participatory research in PRA as follows:

The central thrusts of the [new] paradigm … are decentralization and empowerment. Decentralization means that resources and discretion are devolved, turning back the inward and upward flows of resources and people. Empowerment means that people, especially poorer people, are enabled to take more control over their lives, and secure a better livelihood with ownership and control of productive assets as one key element. Decentralization and empowerment enable local people to exploit the diverse complexities of their own conditions, and to adapt to rapid change.

== Overview of techniques ==
Over the years techniques and tools have been described in a variety of books and newsletters, or taught at training courses. However, the field has been criticized for lacking a systematic evidence-based methodology.

The basic techniques used include:

- Understanding group dynamics, e.g. through learning contracts, role reversals, feedback sessions
- Surveying and sampling, e.g. transect walks, wealth ranking, social mapping
- Interviewing, e.g. focus group discussions, semi-structured interviews, triangulation
- Community mapping, e.g. Venn diagrams, matrix scoring, ecograms, timelines

To ensure that people are not excluded from participation, these techniques avoid writing wherever possible, relying instead on the tools of oral communication and visual communication such as pictures, symbols, physical objects and group memory. Efforts are made in many projects, however, to build a bridge to formal literacy; for example by teaching people how to sign their names or recognize their signatures. Often developing communities are reluctant to permit invasive audio-visual recording.

== Developmental changes in PRA ==
Since the early 21st century, some practitioners have replaced PRA with the standardized model of community-based participatory research (CBPR) or with participatory action research (PAR). Social survey techniques have also changed during this period, including greater use of information technology such as fuzzy cognitive maps, e-participation, telepresence, social network analysis, topic models, geographic information systems (GIS), and interactive multimedia.....

== Use in development practice ==
A 2025 field study entitled "Combining Participatory Rural Appraisal with "Circles of Sustainability" for rural development: A field investigation in India" applied Participatory Rural Appraisal alongside the Circles of Sustainability framework to assess rural development conditions in India. The research showed that PRA's community‑driven data collection methods can be strengthened when combined with multi‑dimensional sustainability metrics, producing a more holistic understanding of social, economic, ecological, and cultural conditions.

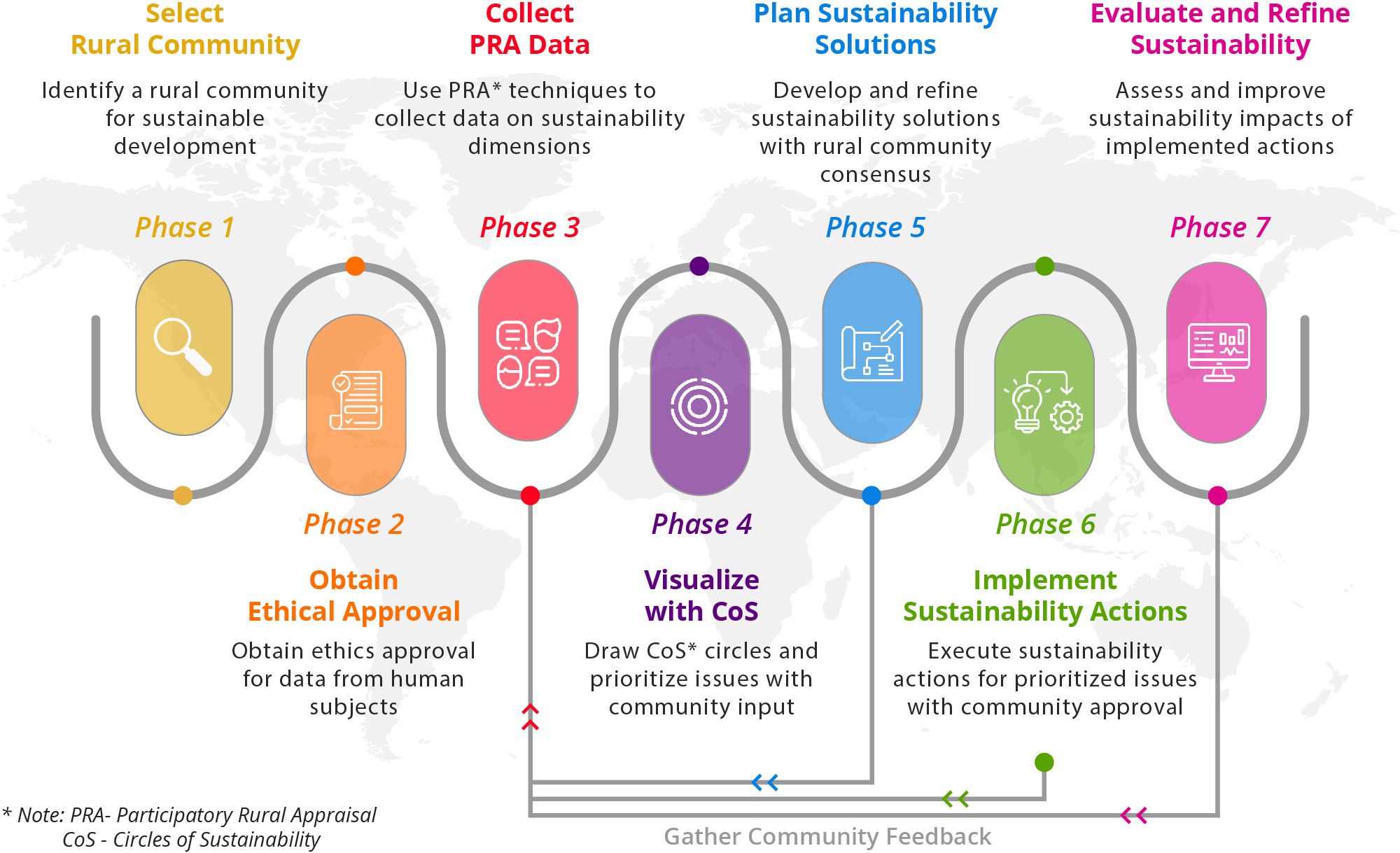
Combination of PRA and CoS for a novel development methodology

== See also ==
- Asset-based community development (ABCD)
- Community-based program design
- Community-led total sanitation
- Farmer Field School
- Participation (decision making)
- Participatory 3D modelling (P3DM)
- Participatory development
- Participatory GIS
- Participatory monitoring
- Participatory poverty assessment
- Participatory technology development
- Praxis intervention
- Problem structuring methods
- Progress in Community Health Partnerships
- Public participation
