= Asset-based community development =

Methodology for uncovering strengths within communities

Asset-based community development (ABCD) is a methodology for the sustainable development of communities based on their strengths and potentials. It involves assessing the resources, skills, and experience available in a community; Organizing the community around issues that move its members into action; and then determining and taking appropriate action. This method uses the community's own assets and resources as the basis for development; it empowers the people of the community by encouraging them to use what they already possess.

The ABCD approach was developed by John L. McKnight and John P. Kretzmann at the Institute for Policy Research at Northwestern University in Evanston, Illinois. They co-authored a book in 1993, Building Communities from the Inside Out: A Path Toward Finding and Mobilizing A Community's Assets, which outlined their asset-based approach to community development. The Community Development Program at Northwestern University's Institute for Policy Research established the Asset-Based Community Development Institute based on three decades of research and community work by John P. Kretzmann and John L. McKnight.

== Principles ==
Needs-based community development emphasizes local deficits and looks to outside agencies for resources. In contrast, asset-based community development focuses on honing and leveraging existing strengths within the community. Related to tenets of empowerment, it postulates that solutions to community problems already exist within a community's assets. Principles that guide ABCD include:

- Everyone has gifts: Each person in a community has something to contribute.
- Relationships build a community: People must be connected in order for sustainable community development to take place.
- Citizens at the center: Citizens should be viewed as actors—not recipients—in development.
- Leaders involve others: Community development is strongest when it involves a broad base of community action.
- People care: Challenge notions of "apathy" by listening to people's interests.
- Listen: Decisions should come from conversations where people are heard.
- Ask: Asking for ideas is more sustainable than giving solutions.
- Inside-out organization: Local community members are in control.
- Institutions serve the community: Institutional leaders should create opportunities for community-member involvement, then "step back."

== Tools ==
The ABCD approach uses several tools to assess and mobilize communities.

=== Capacity inventory ===
1. Skills Information: lists the many skills that a person has gained at home, work, in the community, or elsewhere. Examples of these skills can include internet knowledge, hair-cutting, listening, wallpapering, carpentry, sewing, babysitting, etc.
2. Community Skills: lists the community work in which a person has participated to determine future work they may be interested in.
3. Enterprising Interests and Experience: lists past experience in business and determines interest in starting a business.
4. Personal Information: lists minimum information for follow-up.

=== Asset mapping ===
There are five key assets in any given community: individuals, associations, institutions, physical assets, and connections. These assets are broken down into three categories: Gifts of individuals, Citizens' Associations, and Local Institutions. Asset maps are used in lieu of needs maps which focus solely on negative aspects of communities. Asset maps, on the other hand, focus on community assets, abilities, skills, and strengths in order to build its future.

=== Time banks ===
Time banks are an example of using community assets to connect individuals' assets to one another. Neighbors and local organizations share skills with one another and earn and spend 'TimeBank Hours' or 'credits' in the process, allowing an hour of child care to equal an hour of home repair or tax preparation.

== Ethics ==
Since ABCD relies on existing community assets to create change, it has been criticized for implying that disadvantaged communities have all the resources they need to solve community problems. ABCD has also been opposed by some social policy analysts who see the approach as offering governments the justification for eroding public services and furthering privatization agendas. According to the ABCD Institute, however, ABCD methodology recognizes that systemic injustice may require disadvantaged communities to seek assistance from outside the community. ABCD maintains that interventions from exterior sources will be most effective when a community's assets are leveraged at full capacity. ABCD is described as a more sustainable model of community development than needs-based community development, because needs-based approaches may perpetuate community problems by emphasizing deficiencies and the necessity for reliance on outside assistance. By contrast, ABCD aims to build capacity within communities by expanding their social capital. By working with outside resources and simultaneously building trust within the community, more members can make use of a wider array of strengths.

== Examples ==
Since its introduction in the early 1990s, the ABCD framework has been applied around the world in many different contexts and types of organizations to mobilize community knowledge and assets to address complex community challenges.

The Abundant Community Initiative (ACI) approach, first piloted in Edmonton, Alberta, Canada, in 2013, is an example of how ABCD can be used to revitalize neighborhoods through citizen collaboration with local government and community-based organizations. Municipalities across North America have modelled their own ABCD projects around the lessons learned by the ACI project so the name was changed to Abundant Community Edmonton.

The Coady Institute at St. Francis Xavier University shares case studies of ABCD initiatives on its organizational website. Other case studies of ABCD interventions are documented in Winterford et al's 2023 book A Strength-Based Approach for International Development: Reframing Aid.

There are 17 ABCD sites in Leeds, in the UK, developed under a programme which started in 2013.

== See also ==
- Allotment gardens
- Community
- Community advisory board
- Community-based participatory research (CBPR)
- Community development
- Community psychology
- Family support
- Neighborhoods
- Participatory rural appraisal (PRA)
- Praxis intervention
- Progress in Community Health Partnerships
