= Davydd Greenwood =

American anthropologist

Davydd Greenwood (born 1942) is a Distinguished Professor Emeritus of Anthropology and Director of the Institute for European Studies at Cornell University.

Known action researcher, Greenwood has conducted studies in the Spanish Basque Country, where he analysed Mondragón Corporation, empowerment and cooperatives phenomena. He currently focuses on the future of university idea, in the era of corporate culture.

Greenwood was elected Corresponding Member of the Spanish Royal Academy of Moral and Political Sciences.

== Publications ==
- Davydd Greenwood, Morten Levin (1998) Introduction to Action Research: Social Research for Social Change. Thousand Oaks, California, Sage Publications, Inc
- Davydd Greenwood, José Luis González (1992) Industrial Democracy as Process: Participatory Action Research in the Fagor Cooperative Group of Mondragón, (co-authors Julio Cantón Alonso, Ino Galparsoro Markaide, Alex Goiricelaya Arruza, Isabel Legarreta Nuin, and Kepa Salaberría Amesti), Assen-Maastricht, Van Gorcum Publishers.
