= Center for Urban Research and Learning =

Coordinates: 41°59′57.17″N 87°39′30.03″W

- Established: 1996; 30 years ago
- Location(s): Cuneo Hall, 4th Floor; 1032 W. Sheridan Rd. Chicago, Illinois
- Affiliated faculty: 25 persons
- Advisory Board: 13 members
- Parent organization: Loyola University Chicago
- Affiliations: Jesuit, Catholic
- Website: CURL

Center for Urban Research and Learning (CURL) was founded at Loyola University Chicago in 1996 to create innovative ways to promote equity and opportunity in communities in the Chicago metropolitan area. The team model employed unites research faculty with students and community leaders throughout the urban development process.

== Approach ==
CURL is a partnership between Loyala University and community leaders focused on addressing issues that impact urban minority communities. CURL facilitates community based participatory research.

== Projects ==
- The Greater Roseland West Pullman Food Network (2015).
- Instituto del Progreso Latino (2015)
- Global Citizenship Initiative of the Chicago Public Schools (2012)
- Community Organizing and Family Issues (2014)
- The Family Court Enhancement Project (2014)
- One Northside (2014)
