= Healthcare in Cincinnati =

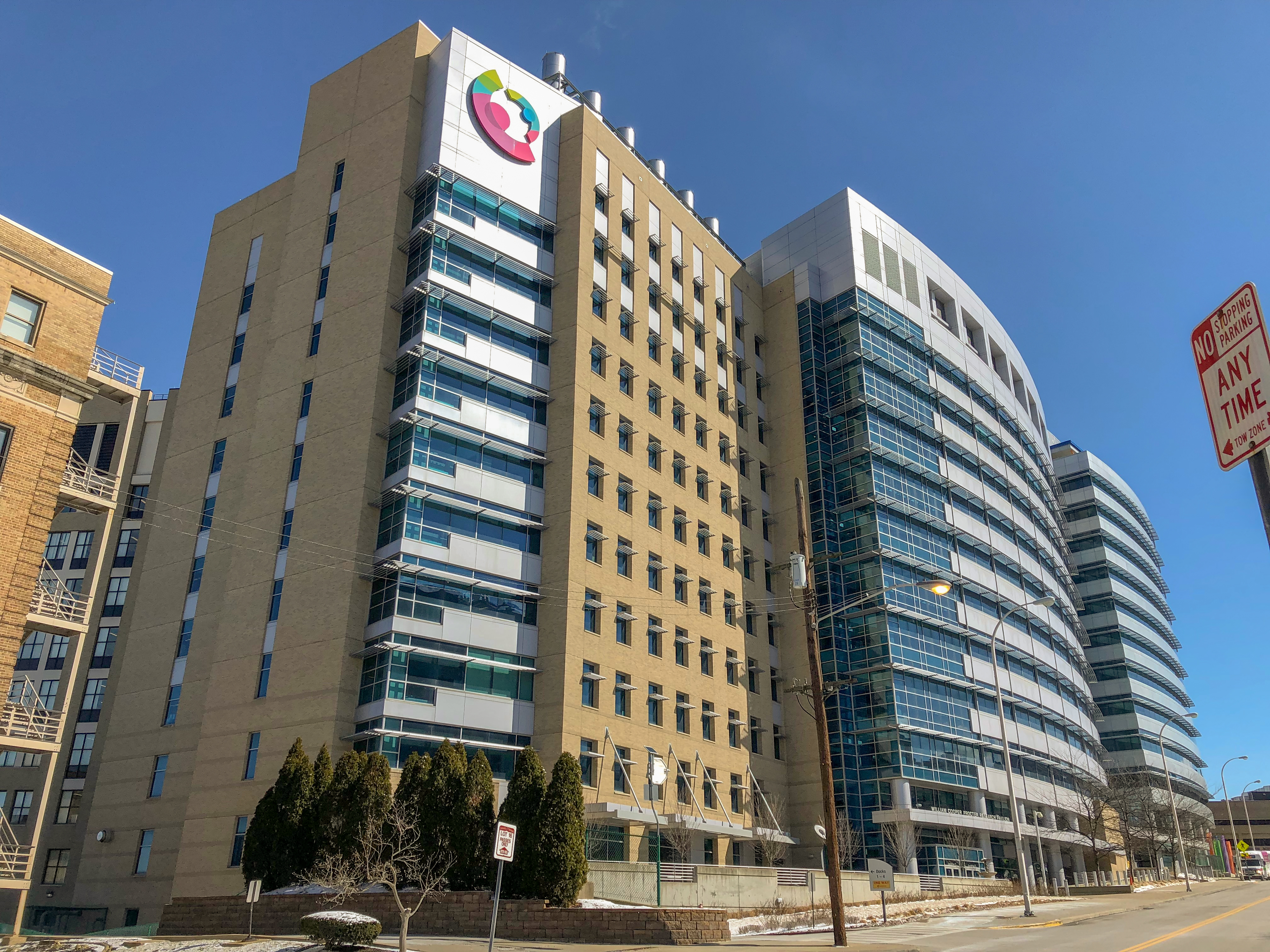
Cincinnati Children's Hospital in Cincinnati, one location of research conducted on developing proper healthcare for children in foster care.

Healthcare research in the United States city of Cincinnati, Ohio has shown development of healthcare programs. Cincinnati Healthcare has also created new innovations in technology, although not all of these projects have been successful. Diversity in Cincinnati Healthcare workplaces has also been researched, and a range of diversity was found. Hospital-at-home services and medical homes in Cincinnati have been researched and developed as well. Non-profit hospitals across the Central Ohio have been found to have an impact on the community in multiple ways.

== Development ==
Since the influenza epidemic of the 20th century, there has been little research and action to help victims of influenza until the Cincinnati War Chest received a request for more research to be done. With the help of the Cincinnati Academy of Medicine, which coordinated a selection of clinics that would help develop a medical program, and physicians of Cincinnati encouraging it, the American Red Cross health initiative in Cincinnati was successful in developing the program.

Another healthcare program developed in Cincinnati was healthcare for foster children. Questions were raised about the healthcare of foster due to missing medical records, state regulations, and certain social conditions. In 2012, the Comprehensive Health Evaluations for Kids worked with Cincinnati Children's Hospital Medical Center, which provided research and new strategies to address the situation of children in foster care, causing the program to provide more healthcare for the city's children in foster care.

== Technology ==
The city of Cincinnati participated in the Beacon Community Cooperative Agreement Program with the goal of using information technology (IT) to build a shared infrastructure that notified primary care practices when a patient was admitted to the hospital or emergency department. With the involvement of healthcare practitioners in Cincinnati, they were successful in creating a new technology system to improve patient care.

The Cincinnati Beacon Project also implemented electronic health records (EHRs) to receive patient data in the hospital. However, the users of EHRs could not easily adapt to the technology and needed to learn more prior to using the EHRs. Because of this, it took an inefficient amount of time to acquire data in the hospital, making the technology only partially useful.

A successful addition of technology was home-based cardiac rehabilitation that improved access to care and reduced costs of community care for Veterans at the Cincinnati Veterans Affairs Medical Center (CVAMC). The CVAMC received a VA Office of Rural Health Policy grant that allowed the start-up of the program and improved cost efficiency.

== Diversity ==
A community advisory board helped researchers from the University of Cincinnati learn about and improve workforce diversity in Greater Cincinnati by analyzing data and addressing gaps in research. Researchers found diverse involvement, a variety of cultures, trust and respect, and consistent commitment to diversity between partners within the workforce of Greater Cincinnati.

== Services ==
Hospital-in-Home services (HIH) were evaluated by the CVAMC and results showed that veterans in Cincinnati receiving HIH services were paying fewer costs for care and had lower chances of admission into a nursing home than veterans who received inpatient care.

Medical home services were not as successful as the HIH services. Research done on primary care practices in Cincinnati found that medical homes could improve the quality of the care they provide and more efficiently control costs by decreasing the use of emergency departments, but the changes are not likely to occur in a fixed amount of time.

== Nonprofit hospitals ==
Non-profit hospitals in cities across Central Ohio provide the same amount of charity care, but when tax data and city community benefit data were analyzed, results showed variability in the community benefit that non-profit hospitals provide to the community.

Research on coding methods and analysis of community health needs assessments (CHNAs), found that non-profit hospitals are taking action on the opioid epidemic within the community.
