= Prajateerpu =

Prajateerpu was a participatory action research (PAR) initiative on the future of food and farming in Andhra Pradesh that took place on 25 June – 1 July 2001 at the Government of India's Farmer Liaison Centre (KVK) in Algole Village, Zaheerabad Taluk, Medak District, Andhra Pradesh, India. Initiated by a coalition of local community groups, it involved the participation of marginal-livelihood citizens from Andhra Pradesh and drew on approaches such as the citizens' jury and scenario workshops.

At a meeting held at the UK Houses of Parliament on 18 March 2002, a smallholder from the Indian state of Andhra Pradesh stood up to launch a report in which she gave a personal account of a controversial participation process called Prajateerpu (Telugu for 'people's verdict'). Anjamma and her fellow jurors concluded that genetically modified crops would have little foreseeable impact on reducing malnutrition in Andhra Pradesh, and also expressed concern over the impact that reliance on artificial fertilizers and pesticides would have on smallholders in the region. They called for local self-sufficiency and endogenous development in farming and food, thereby joining a growing global movement for food sovereignty.
