= Community-based monitoring =

Form of public oversight

Community-based monitoring (CBM) is a form of public oversight, ideally driven by local information needs and community values, to increase the accountability and quality of social services such as health, development aid, or to contribute to the management of natural resources. Within the CBM framework, members of a community affected by a social program or environmental change track this change and its local impacts, and generate demands, suggestions, critiques and data that they then act on, including by feeding back to the organization implementing the program or managing the environmental change.

CBM aims not only to generate the appropriate information for high quality service delivery but also seeks to strengthen local decision-making, public education, community capacity and effective public participation in local government. Ultimately, CBM is a tool to facilitate more inclusive decision-making on issues that are important to members of a community, including increasingly complex aspects of social, economic and environmental factors.

CBM has primarily been used in the disciplines of health and natural resource management.

== CBM and public services ==
Within the public services field, CBM has been used to increase the quality and accountability of health services by enabling local people to evaluate and direct the health services available to them as well as hold healthcare providers accountable to program objectives. CBM of health services aims to promote decentralized inputs for better planning of health activities, based on the locally relevant priorities and issues identified by various community representatives. The most extensive exercise in CBM of health services is being implemented by the Government of India under the National Rural Health Mission (NRHM).

=== CBM and Indian public health ===
Since its launch in 2005, CBM has been an accountability mechanism in the Indian government’s NRHM. CBM of health services is a key strategy of the NRHM to ensure that the services reach those for whom they are meant, especially for those residing in rural areas, the poor, women and children. Community monitoring is also seen as an important aspect of promoting community led action in the NRHM. The national implementation of CBM follows an extensive pilot project in nine of India’s 22 states from May 2007 onwards.

Village Health and Sanitation Committees (VHSCs) are composed of (a) members of local government (Gram Panchayat), (b) community health workers (Accredited Social Health Activists (ASHAs)) (c) outreach functionaries of the public health system (Auxiliary Nurse Midwives (ANMs), Multi-Purpose Workers (MPWs), and preschool/nutrition workers (Anganwadi workers)) and (d) representatives from community groups.

VHSCs meet to monitor and plan public health services at the village level. Separate committees are constructed to monitor public health services at the primary health centre (PHC), Block and District levels. Some members of the VHSC are included in the PHC monitoring committee just as some members of the PHC monitoring committee are part of the Block monitoring committee, and so on up the levels. The adoption of a comprehensive framework for CBM and planning at various levels under NRHM places people at the centre of the process of regularly assessing whether the health needs and rights of the community are being fulfilled.

Including CBM as an officially recognized component of the Indian government’s NRHM followed several years of advocacy by health rights organizations to develop a model of community accountability of health services particularly in the states of Maharashtra and Madhya Pradesh.

Much of the initial work to develop an Indian model of CBM was driven by the Advisory Group of Community Action (AGCA), a group of experts specially constituted by the union health ministry to provide technical and other inputs on how to implement NRHM programmes wherever community action was envisaged. The health advocacy non-governmental organization SATHI-CEHAT, in collaboration with many local community-based people’s organizations, also played a key role in coordinating pilot CBM projects.

The 1999 to 2000 project in Maharashtra “Empowering the rural poor for better health” was co-ordinated by SATHI-CEHAT with support from the Union Ministry of Health. This project led to the development of Jan Sunwais and village health calendars/registers, two tools for social audits of health services that were later included in the NRHM model.

Jan Sunwais (Public Tribunals) are public events, attended by government officials and medical professionals in that region, where people are invited to report their experiences of poor health services and denial of care. The authorities present are then expected to respond to these testimonials.

Village health calendars/registers are publicly displayed monthly records, maintained by the VHSC, that compare mandated services to delivered services and note upcoming events such as immunization camps or visits by the health outreach functionaries ANMs and MPWs. They aim to track the delivery of services and ensure that village health and nutrition functionaries visit the village on the specified days and perform the stipulated activities.

The Indian National Human Rights Committee, with help from Jan Swasthya Abhiyan (the Indian arm of the international People's Health Movement), organised a series of Jan Sunwais, otherwise known as Public Hearings on the Right to Health Care in 2004 and 2005. SATHI-CEHAT was at the time secretariat of the JSA and played the facilitated a series of Jan Sunwais.

The preparatory and follow up activities of Jan Sunwai were among the first systematic efforts towards communitising the agenda of Health Rights. The Indian media reported extensively on the poor condition of the public health system exposed during these events. Health advocacy organizations argued that the appalling experiences faced by many people when accessing public health services highlight the need for an official mechanism of citizen-driven accountability.

The 2004 and 2005 Jan Sunwais had a strong influence on the Indian Ministry of Health and contributed to the ministry’s decision to include CBM in the NRHM. Another important factor that contributed to the ministry’s decision was the capacity of CBM to generate information about health services that enables data triangulation.

=== CBM and MSH/UNICEF ===
A form of CBM has been developed by Management Science for Health (MSH) and the United Nations Children’s Fund (UNICEF) that utilizes the Monitoring Curve. This type of CBM has been used extensively for monitoring MCH/PHC activities, in countries implementing the Bamako Initiative. It is to be used on a periodic basis, for example, every quarter, when reviewing performance or achievement of objectives.

The monitoring curve is a graphic representation of the obstacles to attaining optimal coverage of health interventions. Service users work with service delivery personnel, including the program manager, to monitor a health service. They first select what health service to monitor (for example prenatal care) then the population of concern (for example all women who have delivered babies in that location in the last six months). Next, they develop five indicators to monitor, one for each of the following five determinates: availability of resources, geographic availability of services, utilization of services, adequate coverage, and effective coverage.

Each indicator is assigned a percent corresponding to the percent of time that the resource was available or percent of the target population to which the indicator applied. These measures are then displayed as a line graph, arranged hierarchically with availability of resources at the bottom and effective coverage at the top. By looking at the angle of the line, as it tilts from high levels of availability (lower right) to lower levels of effective coverage (upper right), viewers can determine which components of a service are inhibiting the target population from benefiting. A problem or "bottleneck" exists when the curve angles steeply to the left (lower percentage) between indicators. This indicates there has been a drop of coverage. Thus, the use of the Monitoring Curve will help to monitor some proxy indicators of quality of care, alert us to the existence of problems, and pinpoint the problems.

=== CBM and public services in Malawi ===
Researchers from the Overseas Development Institute carried out a political economy analysis of a CBM scorecard initiative in Malawi. They found that the scorecard system demonstrated the potential to improve public service delivery, but that this was not simply due to a strengthening of citizens' voices and demand. It appeared that the nature of the civil society organisation implementing the initiative and the quality of local leadership were also important in determining outcomes. A key factor for success appeared to be the facilitation of collaborative spaces, through which key stakeholders could come together to develop joint action plans.

== CBM and natural resources ==
CBM of natural resources is a mechanism to engage communities in natural resource management in ways that contribute to local sustainability. CBM of natural resources is also known as participatory monitoring. It can be defined as "The systematic collection of information at regular intervals for initial assessment and for the monitoring of change. This collection is undertaken by locals in a community who do not have professional training". CBM of natural resources enables community members affected by a particular environmental condition or resource depletion to collect data on changes in natural resources, and on the socio-economic conditions of communities dependent on these resources. They can then analyse the data; feed back relevant information to the government or relevant organizational bodies; and take informed decisions on their own management of natural resources.

CBM enables concerned citizens, government agencies, industry, academia, community groups and local institutions to collaborate to monitor, track, and respond to environmental issues of common community concern.

CBM has been used for a wide variety of natural resource management projects. For example, CBM has been used in the Udzungwa Mountains, Tanzania to involve local people in wildlife management. In Brazil, fishing communities are managing the endangered arapaima fish, and have limited their catch as a result of data they collected and analysed. In the Torres Strait, Australia, a CBM project called Seagrass-Watch has successfully trained community members to accurately monitor and report changes in the health of local seagrass species. Several Canadian environmental CBM initiatives have been successful. Further examples are collated here.

As well as contributing to improved livelihoods and forest biodiversity conservation, CBM in tropical forests has the potential to help meet the challenge of cost-effective monitoring for REDD+. For example, in the state of Acre, Brazil, residents of the Chico Mendes Extractive Reserve have collected information that has informed reserve management and been incorporated into planning for REDD+ in the state.

== Issues in CBM ==
=== Community empowerment versus data collection ===
CBM is rapidly increasing in popularity and has come to mean different things to different parties involved. The term CBM is relatively new and has thus far lacked a consistent definition, leaving it open to different interpretations. This flexibility in meaning has enabled groups with conflicting agendas to agree on its implementation but has simultaneously led to clashes or disappointment of some parties further down the line. In the case of CBM within the NRHM, policy makers at the government level assumed that the main purpose of community monitoring would be to generate data. In contrast, civil society stakeholders (NGOs and people’s organizations) envisioned CBM as a mode of facilitating grassroots health activism.

=== Defining “community” ===
Communities are heterogeneous, with different members having differing opinions, needs, and access to power. CBM programs must be careful not to assume that the loudest voices are representative of the community’s needs, or even that the community has only one set of needs.

== See also ==
- Opinion poll
- Political egalitarianism
- Public opinion
- Voter turnout
