= Robert Chambers (development scholar) =

British sociologist (born 1932)

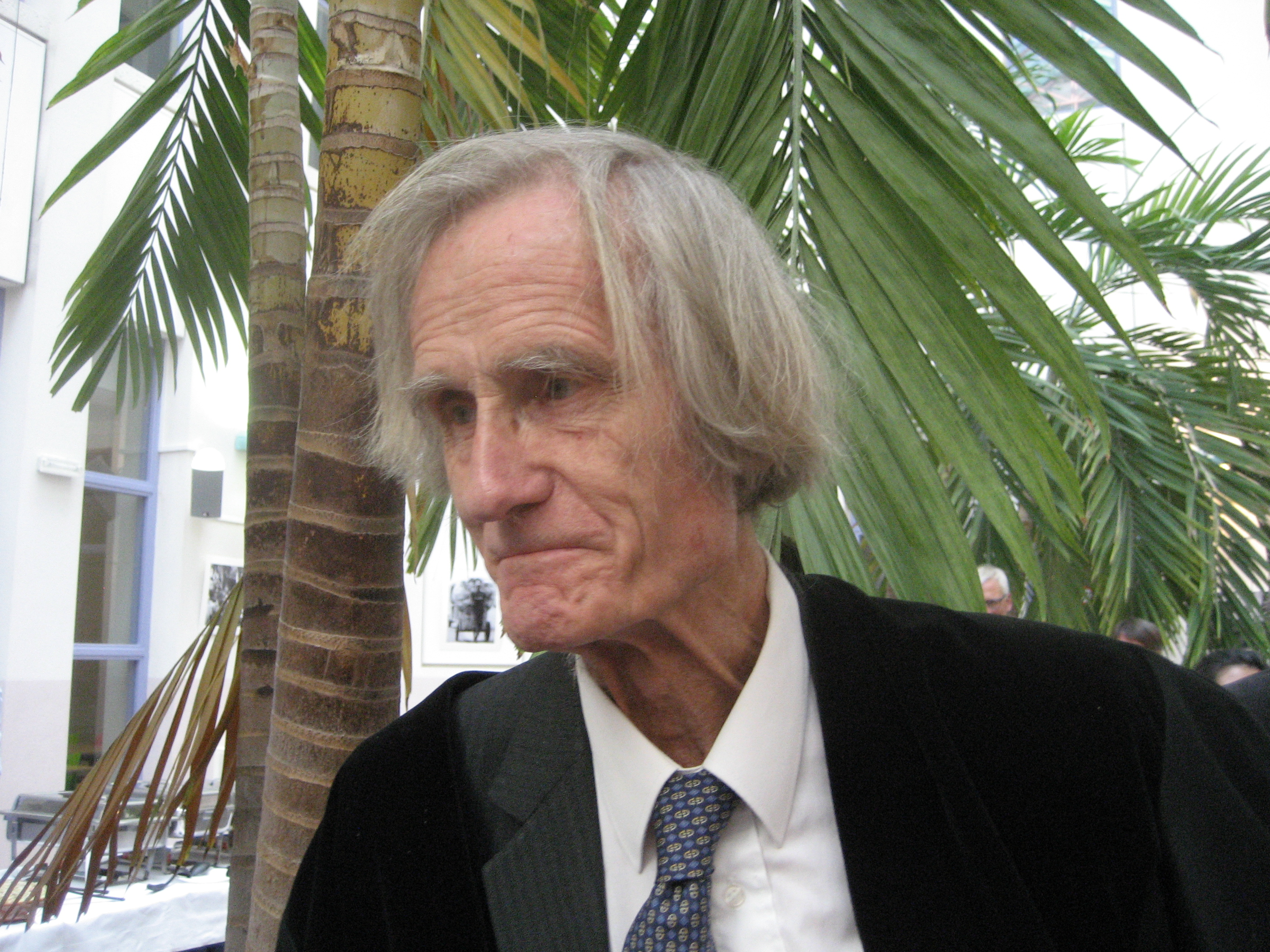
- Chambers in 2015
- Born: Robert John Haylock Chambers; 1 May 1932 (age 94); Chichester, England
- Education: University of Cambridge (BA); University of Manchester (PhD); University of Pennsylvania
- Occupations: Development practitioner, academic
- Spouse: Jennifer Scott
- Children: 3
- Website: OpenDocs IDS

Robert John Haylock Chambers OBE (born 1 May 1932) is a British academic and development practitioner. He spent his academic career at the Institute of Development Studies, University of Sussex. In 2013 he became an honorary fellow of the International Institute of Social Studies.

== Early life and education ==
Chambers grew up in a middle-class family in Cirencester, England. He won a scholarship to Marlborough College boarding school from 1945 to 1950, and another to Cambridge University, which was interrupted by National Service. He graduated in 1955 (1st, History). He joined and led the Gough Island Scientific Survey for the British government in 1956, before attending the University of Pennsylvania where he failed to complete a PhD in history. In 1958 he joined the HM Overseas Civil Service in Kenya, working in Maralal from 1958 to 1960. Before and after Independence he lectured at the Kenya Institute of Administration and the East Africa Staff College, returning to Britain in 1966 where he lectured at the University of Manchester and completed a PhD. From 1967 he lectured at the University of Glasgow and from 1969, the University of Nairobi. He joined the Institute of Development Studies, University of Sussex in 1972. Some time later he was infamously turned down for a Professorship at IDS on the grounds of insufficient publications in academic journals, despite his world renown exceeding those on the panel, achieving this only in 1995 at the age of 63, not long before retirement. During time at IDS he had lengthy secondments to India and other countries.

== Approach ==
His work on resettlement and irrigation schemes, and public administration, was the subject of his PhD, and early work in Kenya and the UK. It was only from the 1980s that his work on rapid and participatory forms of appraisal were developed.

Chambers has been one of the leading advocates for putting the poor, destitute and marginalised at the centre of the processes of development policy. Cornwall and Scoones refer to him as "development's best advocate". In particular he argues the poor should be taken into account when the development problem is identified, policy formulated and projects implemented. He popularised within development circles such phrases as "putting the last first" and stressed the now generally accepted need for development professionals to be critically self-aware.

The widespread acceptance of a "participatory" approach is in part due to his work. This includes the techniques of participatory rural appraisal, some of which he developed himself or with others. In his later career, there were criticisms of their use, and he questioned whether his unabashed populism had ignored tokenistic manipulation of participatory methods: his experience with larger organisations like the World Bank were not positive. His last research area has been Community-Led Total Sanitation, developed by Kamal Kar to halt open defecation practices, including the use of 'timely, relevant and actionable' research with his colleagues in the Sanitation Learning Hub programme at the Institute of Development Studies.

Robert Chambers and Gordon Conway provided the first elaborated definition of the concept of sustainable livelihoods, which reads:

a livelihood comprises the capabilities, assets (stores, resources, claims and access) and activities required for a means of living: a livelihood is sustainable which can cope with and recover from stress and shocks, maintain or enhance its capabilities and assets, and provide sustainable livelihood opportunities for the next generation; and which contributes net benefits to their livelihoods at the local and global levels and in the short and long term

— Chambers and Conway 1991, 6

Chambers is a prolific author, of 18 books and hundreds of reports, articles, and training materials.

== Personal life ==
He married Jennifer Scott, who he met in Glasgow, and has three children.

In 2020 he suffered an amputation below the knee, describing the immersion of over 10 weeks as a patient and participant-observer in an NHS hospital and then in a private sector care home.

During his time teaching at University of Nairobi in Kenya in the 1960s, Chambers started rock climbing. Throughout his career he did multiple first ascents notably in Kenya and India. Of particular note is his first ascent of Mt. Ololokwe in Northern Kenya by The Original Route which he completed in 1965 with Henry Mwongela.

== Festschrifts and honours ==
- Cornwall, A. and I. Scoones (eds.) 2011.Revolutionizing Development: reflections on the work of Robert Chambers. London: Earthscan.
- Mukherjee Amitava (ed.). 2004. Participatory Rural Appraisal Methods and Applications in Rural Planning: Essays in Honour of Robert Chambers. Concept, Second Revised Edition, ISBN 81-8069-105-5
- Order of the British Empire, 1995.
- Honorary doctorate, University of Edinburgh
- Honorary DLitt, University of Sussex, 2007.
- Honorary DLitt, University of East Anglia, 1995.
- Doctor Honoris Causa, Erasmus University (ISS), 2013

== Key works ==
- Chambers R. 2017. Can We Know Better?: Reflections for Development. Rugby: Practical Action Publishing.
- Chambers R. 2014. Into the Unknown: Explorations in Development Practice. Rugby: Practical Action Publishing.
- Chambers R. 2010. Provocations for Development. Rugby: Practical Action Publishing.
- Chambers R. and K.Kar. 2008. Handbook of Community-led total Sanitation. Plan UK and IDS.
- Chambers R. 2008. Revolutions in Development Inquiry. London: Earthscan.
- Chambers, R. 2005. Ideas for Development. London: Earthscan.
- Chambers R. 2002. Participatory Workshops: a sourcebook of 21 sets of ideas and activities. London: Earthscan.
- Narayan, D., R. Chambers, N. Shah and P. Petesch. 1999. ''Global synthesis: consultations with the poor''. Washington DC: the World Bank.
- Chambers R. 1997. Whose Reality Counts: Putting the First Last. London: Intermediate Technology Publications.
- Chambers, R. 1993. Challenging the Professions: frontiers for rural development. London: Intermediate Technology Publications.
- Chambers, R. and G.R. Conway. 1991. Sustainable Rural Livelihoods: Practical Concepts for the 21st Century. Institute of Development Studies DP 296
- Chambers R., A. Pacey and L.A.Thrupp (eds.). 1989. Farmer First: farmer innovation and agricultural research. London: Intermediate Technology Publications.
- Chambers R., N.C.Saxenia and T.Shah. 1989. To the hands of the poor: water and trees. IBH and IT Publications.
- Chambers, R. 1988. Managing canal irrigation: practical analysis from South Asia. Cambridge University Press.
- Chambers R. 1983. Rural Development: putting the last first. Essex, England: Longmans Scientific and Technical Publishers; New York: John Wiley.
- Chambers, R., R.Longhurst and A.Pacey (eds.) 1981. Seasonal Dimensions to Rural Poverty. London: Frances Pinter.
- Chambers, R. 1977. Botswanas' Accelerated Rural Development Programme 1973-1976. Gaborone: Government Printer.
- Chambers, R. 1974. Managing Rural Development: ideas and experiences from East Africa. (repub. 1976, Kumarian Press.)
- Chambers, R. 1974. Rural Development in Botswana. Gaborone: Government Printer.
- Chambers, R and Moris, J. 1973. Mwea: an irrigated rice settlement scheme in Kenya. Munich: Weltforum Verlag.
- Chambers, R. 1970. The Volta Resettlement Experience. London: Pall Mall Press and Praeger.
- Chambers, R. 1969. Settlement Schemes in Tropical Africa: a study of organisations and development. London: Routledge & Kegan Paul.
- Chambers, R.J.H. 1967. Organisation of settlement schemes: a comparative study of some settlement schemes in anglophone Africa with special reference to the Mwea Irrigation Settlement Kenya. PhD Thesis. Manchester: University of Manchester.

== Other sources ==
- Chambers, R. 2005. Critical Reflections of a Development Nomad, Chapter 4 in Kothari, Uma (Ed.) A Radical History of Development Studies: Individuals, Institutions and Ideologies. London: Zed Books.
- Interview with Kees Biekart and Des Gasper, 2013.
- A complete bibliography spanning four decades of research on participatory development. The archive includes full text access to over 70 per cent of Chamber's publications.The Robert Chambers Archive

== See also ==
- Rapid Rural Appraisal
