= Action Research (journal) =

- Discipline: Action research
- Language: English
- Edited by: Hilary Bradbury

Publication details
- History: 2003-present
- Publisher: SAGE Publications
- Frequency: Quarterly
- Impact factor: 2.102 (2020)

Standard abbreviations
- ISO 4: Action Res.

Indexing
- ISSN: 1476-7503 (print); 1741-2617 (web)
- LCCN: 2003234239
- OCLC no.: 475188442

Links
- Journal homepage; Online access; Online archive

Action Research is a quarterly peer-reviewed academic journal that covers the field of action research. The journal was established in 2003 and is published by SAGE Publications. The editor-in-chief is Hilary Bradbury (AR+ Foundation).

== Abstracting and indexing ==
The journal is abstracted and indexed in Scopus and the Social Sciences Citation Index. According to the Journal Citation Reports, the journal has a 2020 impact factor of 2.102.
