= Cooperative inquiry =

Type of social science methodology

Cooperative inquiry, also known as collaborative inquiry, is a form of action research that was first proposed by John Heron in 1971 and later expanded with Peter Reason. The major idea of cooperative inquiry is to "research 'with' rather than 'on' people". It emphasizes that all active participants are fully involved in research decisions as co-researchers. Cooperative inquiry creates a research cycle among four different types of knowledge: propositional knowing (as in contemporary science), practical knowing (the knowledge that comes with actually doing what you propose), experiential knowing (the feedback we get in real time about our interaction with the larger world) and presentational knowing (the artistic rehearsal process through which we craft new practices). The research process iterates these four stages at each cycle with deepening experience and knowledge of the initial proposition, or of new propositions, at every cycle.

- Stage 1: The first reflection phase that determines topics and methods of inquiry. This phase involves primarily propositional knowing.
- Stage 2: The first action phase, usually within the group, that tests the agreed actions, records outcomes from the testing, and observes if the actions conform to the original ideas from Stage 1. This stage involves primarily practical knowing.
- Stage 3: A second action phase, usually by individuals in their everyday life outside the group, where the experiences and the consequences of one's new inquiries in action can generate profound new feelings and awarenesses. In this stage, the experiences may lead to new fields, actions and insights that depart from the original ideas. This stage involves primarily experiential knowing.
- Stage 4: The second reflection phase when, in the group, co-researchers reflect on their experiences and the data collected in Stages 2 and 3. Now they may re-frame the original ideas and amend inquiry procedures. In this stage, co-researchers also decide whether to proceed to further cycles in the inquiry processes. This stage involves primarily presentational knowing, developing new images and ways of acting. This leads back to propositional knowing, if the inquiry group decides to start a next cycle.

== See also ==
- Interpretative phenomenological analysis
- Participatory action research
- Praxis intervention
