= Progress in Community Health Partnerships =

Progress in Community Health Partnerships: Research, Education, and Action
- Discipline: Healthcare
- Language: English

Publication details
- History: 2007-present
- Publisher: Johns Hopkins University Press (United States)

Standard abbreviations
- ISO 4: Prog. Community Health Partnersh.

Indexing
- ISSN: 1557-0541 (print); 1557-055X (web)
- LCCN: 2005214975
- OCLC no.: 61125691

Links
- Journal homepage; Online access

Progress in Community Health Partnerships: Research, Education, and Action is a peer-reviewed medical journal published quarterly by the Johns Hopkins University Press. In each issue, one article is selected for a “Beyond the Manuscript” podcast. All original research articles contain a Community/Policy brief, which describes key findings and recommendations in language accessible to non-researchers. The journal recruits at least one individual from outside academe to be among the peer reviewers for a submitted manuscript.

== See also ==
- Community-based participatory research
- Participatory action research
- Asset-based community development (ABCD)
- Community organizing
