= Morten Levin =

Norwegian sociologist

Morten Levin (11 July 1946 – 23 April 2023) was a Norwegian sociologist and Professor of Organization and Work Science at the Norwegian University of Science and Technology (NTNU). He was formerly a Research Director at SINTEF and worked for the Royal Norwegian Defense Research Establishment and universities throughout Scandinavia and at Cornell University. His research focused on change in organizations, especially with a view to the importance of the interaction between technology and organization. He contributed to the epistemological and methodological basis of action research, and has published books and articles on organization and management, organizational development and action research.

Levin studied mechanical engineering and graduated with a master's degree in Operations Research and Economics in 1971. In 1981, he earned a PhD (mag.art.) in sociology. He joined the then-University of Trondheim as an assistant professor in 1976, was promoted to associate professor in 1982 and full professor in 1992.

He was a member of an international committee evaluating the entire Danish PhD education in 2006. He is a member of the editorial boards of Systemic Practice and Action Research, Action Research, Action Research International, Handbook of Qualitative Inquiry and Handbook of Action Research.

== Views on Israel ==
Morten Levin, who was Jewish, was also a critic of Israel, and was one of the initiators of a petition that NTNU boycott Israel because he meant that "since 1948 the state of Israel has occupied Palestinian land and denied the Palestinians basic human rights". Together with Ann Rudinow Sætnan (an American-born Jewish Professor of Sociology at NTNU) and Rune Skarstein, he organized a conference on the Middle East conflict in 2009, attracting scholars such as Ilan Pappe, Stephen Walt and Moshe Zuckermann. Israel's embassy in Norway protested against the conference. Alan M. Dershowitz used the conference as an example of Norwegian academia being "one-sided" and "anti-semitic" in a 2011 op-ed. In a 2009 op-ed in Adresseavisen, Levin criticized the labelling of critics of Israel as "Anti-semites", describing it as the "daily dose of propaganda from pro-Israeli organizations and media".

== Selected publications ==
- Davydd Greenwood, Morten Levin, Introduction to Action Research: Social Research for Social Change, SAGE Publications, 2006
- Morten Levin, Researching Enterprise Development: Action Research on the Cooperation Between Management and Labour in Norway, John Benjamins Publishing Co, 2002
- Morten Levin, Roger Klev, Forandring som praksis: Læring og utvikling i organisasjoner, Fagbokforlaget, 2002
- Morten Levin, Nonverbal Communication Across Disciplines: Culture, Sensory Interaction, Speech, Conversation, John Benjamins Pub Co, 2002
