= Management Learning =

- Discipline: Economics
- Language: English
- Edited by: Emma Bell and Todd Bridgman

Publication details
- Former names: Management Education and Development
- History: 1970-present
- Publisher: SAGE Publications
- Frequency: 5/year
- Impact factor: 1.393 (2015)

Standard abbreviations
- ISO 4: Manag. Learn.

Indexing
- ISSN: 1350-5076 (print); 1461-7307 (web)
- LCCN: 94660077
- OCLC no.: 41552077

Links
- Journal homepage; Online access; Online archive

Management Learning is a peer-reviewed academic journal that publishes papers in the field of management five times per year. The journal's editors are Emma Bell (Keele University) and Todd Bridgman (Victoria University of Wellington). The journal was established in 1970 and is published by SAGE Publications.

== Abstracting and indexing ==
The journal is abstracted and indexed in Scopus and the Social Sciences Citation Index. According to the Journal Citation Reports, its 2015 impact factor is 1.393, ranking it 90 out of 192 journals in the category "Management".
