= Praxis intervention =

Form of participatory action research

Praxis intervention is a form of participatory action research that emphasizes working on the praxis potential, or phronesis, of its participants. This contrasts with other forms of participatory action research, which emphasize the collective modification of the external world. Praxis potential means the members' potential to reflexively work on their respective mentalities; participant here refers not just to the clientele beneficiaries of the praxis intervention project, but also the organisers and experts participating in such a project. Praxis intervention is intended to lead its members through a "participant objectivation". The method prioritizes unsettling the settled mentalities, especially where the settled mindsets prevalent in the social world or individuals is suspected to have sustained or contributed to their suffering or marginality.

== Reflexive and routine praxis ==
Karl Marx conceptualized praxis in two forms: reflexive and non-reflexive.

Mihailo Marković expanded on the concept of praxis, identifying key elements such as creativity, autonomy, sociality, rationality, and intentionality. These moments of praxis offer alternatives to sameness, subordination, massification, blind reaction, and compliance.

== Reasons ==
Praxis intervention makes research, creative expression or technology development into a bottom-up process. It democratizes making of art, science, technology and critical conscience. The praxis intervention method aims at provoking members to unsettle their settled mindsets and to have a fresh look at the world around and intervene. For instance, members may take a fresh critical look on the gender relations existing, if the praxis intervention method is applied to study gender relations. They would be unsettling their biographically and structurally ingrained perceptions of gender relations and freshly look at it. A gradual process by which members are helped to reflexively recognize the arbitrary and discriminating mindsets within themselves and the world around and working towards correcting it is praxis intervention. The praxis intervention method helps members to struggle against structurally ingrained discrimination.

Praxis intervention helps respondents to come out with answers which they would not have otherwise expressed. Questionnaire based surveys, formal interviews, and even focus group discussions are not useful to help respondents to come out with genuine answers to the questions posed at them. Praxis intervention as it helps groups of people probing their own conditions phase by phase through prolonged discussions, experiments and conscious explorations is capable of coming out with better quality data that could be useful for the group to challenge existing epistemic structures and work out their own well-being.

Praxis intervention is useful wherever reflexivity is a major component in a research project.

== Systematic participant objectivation ==
Praxis intervention interferes not only with the habitus of the people with whom the action research is carried out, but also the praxis intervention practitioner's own habitus. In this respect, the practice of praxis intervention is also a systematic participant objectivation. Participatory objectivation is "objectifying the act of objectification". By objectifying the objectification it is meant the researcher, while observing and objectifying, takes a similar critical distance towards the objectification itself. It is being sensitive to the immensely possible biases from the researcher's social coordinates, field and intellectual orientation and self-critically problematising them to reduce the impact of the biases.

According to Bourdieu, within the sociological analysis, the participant objectivation is the essential but difficult exercise of all because it requires the break with the deepest and most conscious adherence and adhesions, those quite often give the object its very interest for those who study it, that is, everything about their relation to the object they try to know that they least want to know. It is through the participant objectivation that the practical relation to practice is substituted with the observer's relation to practice. Through the practice of participant objectivation, Bourdieu aims to make the critical and political activity of social research the "solvent of doxa". Though the practice of reflexive participant objectivation, the practitioner re-looks the taken-for-granted assumptions in order to wake up from their epistemic sleep and helps their clients too to help them to wake up from their own.

== In practice ==
Praxis intervention as a practice involves working on the bias of the professionals and their clientele. It is a practical method of "objectifying objectification" on a collective basis. The praxis intervention method problematizes the bias of the researcher and her clientele emerging from their social origins, class, gender coordinates; their position in the intellectual field and in their respective social space; and also their "intellectual bias," the results of viewing the world as a spectacle.

In practice it involves the clientele and the researchers collectively probing into a problem that affects the clientele and helping the clientele to find solutions to their problem through reflexive probing with the experts belonging to relevant fields. The project aims at the clientele and the researchers work together and collectively learn from each other. Praxis intervention can be carried out in phased manner. The first phase could involve orienting the clientele (and experts as well) of the problem under focus. The problem under focus could be anything like existing status of marginality, gender relation, health condition or status of present technology etc. Once the problem could properly be oriented from as much angles as possible the clientele, experts and others could involve discussing appropriate method to probe the issue under discussion. They could also decide on the phases through which the collective probing to be undertaken. The second phase could be clientele exploring the issue themselves through the methods collectively agreed. They could maintain a journal to record their experiences and reflexive probing. The third phase could be the clientele coming together with experts and sharing their experience with their fellow clients and experts. After discussing all the observations and experiences the method of enquiry can be further fine-tuned for better understanding. Gradually the clientele could be guided to intervene on the issue concerned and document their experience. Their action and reflexion could be discussed and fine tuned for further interventions. The phases and intervention strategies could be decided as it could be appropriate for different problems.

Praxis intervention method focuses on what happens to mindsets. In the community work situation it could be a project helping the community participants to undertake a systematic research on themselves in the areas such as history of their social relationships, land ownership patterns, critically exploring gender relations, studying the ecological changes happening in their habitat, learning historically and comparatively on their health status, nutrition status etc. The research undertook by the local residents can be converted into social actions or welfare projects.

The practice of praxis intervention can be used in many fields such as post positivist research, social work research, participatory action research, local history research, social action and social work projects, clinical health research, community health research projects, participatory technology development projects, and many other projects where people's participation and their critical reflexivity is crucial.

=== In education ===
The method can be used in the field of education. Educational process can be re constituted in accordance to the learning capabilities of the sets of students. Students going under the process of praxis intervention would listen to the expert opinions and explanations of the phenomenon under discussion and they would carry out experiments in the laboratory or in appropriate practical field relevant to the phenomenon under focus individually, collectively and collaboratively as they are guided by the expert teachers. They would bring back the results of experiments to the classroom setting and clarify with each other and also with the expert teachers. In this process syllabus can be indicative negotiable taking into consideration of the advancement of knowledge creation. In this process knowledge becomes creative appropriation rather than indoctrination. This may help students to gain great quantity of quality knowledge within short periods of time. The method could be effectively used in pre-primary to Higher schools of education. The method could be used in development of professional skills such as engineering, medicine, nursing, law, agricultural science, social work, management, career guidance, expertise development, teaching and other such fields.

For instance, students of various technology oriented courses can be guided to develop and enhance technology by going under a praxis intervention experiment with users, experts and other relevant stakeholders. This could be appropriate for development and promotion of free software.

=== In healthcare ===
Similarly, praxis intervention can be used in helping patients to undergo a participatory diagnostic and experience sharing research with the medical professionals and other experts on their health conditions and take necessary action. Patients with similar diseases, their family members, and their significant others, medical practitioners and relevant experts can sit together and be guided, as a group, through informed dialogue, systematic corrective measures, and experience sharing. In this process both the facilitating professionals and the patients can overcome their respective personal and professional bias.

=== In social work ===
The praxis intervention method could be extended to the professional social work practice in facilitating the social workers themselves and their clients overcoming personal or social mindsets that induce suffering or marginality. The praxis mode of social work depends on the sensibility that could be provoked in a given context: sensible towards one's own biography, historical locatedness, spatial positioning and the interaction setting. The praxis intervention practice has its implications for social work education. A social work education based on praxis model could shape the students and teachers self-reflexive, sensible. Through this method, it may be possible for students gaining theoretical and practical skills. The method can be used in other branches of education and training like the management education, medical education, agriculture extension and other fields where the clientele really matter. However, the praxis model would be yielding better results if sufficient flexibility is maintained. It could be a model for providing companionship to people in need of self-exploration. Praxis intervention as a practice can be carried on to the extent it is possible for people to take care of themselves and to the extent people require professional companionship of the social work practice. Praxis intervention practice requires the professionals and the client participants to be self-reflexive and self-critical. The model provides opportunity for the social worker to undertake a reflexive inward journey to get rid of biases that affect her practice. The context that is not suitable for self-reflexivity or self-criticism is not suitable for praxis intervention practice either.

The praxis practice could also be extended to social work practice in the medical setting, AIDS care, psychiatric social work, management of juvenile delinquency, school social work, correctional administration practices in prison social work, gender related social work practice, geriatric social work, etc.

The relevance of praxis intervention in social work

The method could be fruitful in working with the marginalized people as marginalisation is usually a historical phenomenon. This would avoid people losing self-respect and dignity under the conditions of marginalisation. The method could be applied in other conditions of marginalisation such as working with people discriminated on the basis of gender. It can also serve as a model for opportunity scanning. The praxis intervention can be used as a method to initiate and implement participatory project provided the project has sufficient flexibility inbuilt for effecting a change from its pre-designs. A project management from praxis perspective should not have full-fledged blue print beforehand, rather the projects should be flexible enough to wait until the participants themselves research and come out with a project plan. In the new practice, the experts could be facilitated to work with the participants. While a project is designed and carried out with this method, there should be options to change the course of project or even to suspend some projects according to the collective findings and evaluations of the collaborative research. Similarly the praxis method could be used in the planning process provided sufficient flexibility is allowed and reflexivity is tolerated. It has to be further tested whether the model works with socially, economically, and culturally heterogeneous set of people.

The praxis intervention model of social intervention may not be applicable in all contexts. There are sections of people who cannot take care of themselves and hence require absolute external care. For example, persons with progressive, irreversible diseases characterised by degeneration of the brain cells such as Alzheimer's disease would require complete external care. The praxis practice would be inappropriate for the people who do not need care. The approach could be helpful in accompanying people who can be helped to care for themselves. Praxis intervention practice is appropriate for working with the people who can be helped to care themselves within a scale of caring.

This method has been used in development of bottom-up organizational ethics, generating participatory forms of art and music and also in transformative nursing practices.

== See also ==
- Appreciative inquiry
- Communicative action
- Communicative rationality
- Community practice
- Critical realism
- Cooperative inquiry
- Narrative inquiry
- Participatory rural appraisal
- Phronetic social science
- Postpositivism
- Praxis School
