= Community advisory board =

A community advisory board (often called a CAB) is a type of advisory board consisting of representatives of the general public who meet with representatives of an institution to relay information between the two groups. CABs are especially associated with clinical research, in which case they review the clinical research ethics associated with the human subject research which a medical research institution conducts. CABs are an aspect of community-based participatory research.

== Purpose ==
Community advisory boards (CABs) benefit research institutions by providing advice about the efficacy of the informed consent process and the implementation of research protocols. The CAB composition is representative of the community participating in the research being reviewed.

Researchers who consult with CABs get information which they would not otherwise get about the target community demographic which they are researching.

== Ethics ==
The CAB is intended to be a way to respect the rights of research participants. Research in a community has the potential for group harm, which is distinct from the individual harm which can happen to individuals who participate. Because of the risk to communities, researchers have an obligation to community stakeholders to seek community feedback about the research.

== Duties of CABs ==
CABs and researchers must continually decide which powers to invest in a CAB. Here are some common questions which must be decided:

1. What interaction should CABs have with institutional review boards?
2. What education and training should the research institution give to the CAB members to enable them to perform their duties?
3. To what extent should CABs participate in the development of informed consent processes?
4. To what extent should CABs participate in developing guidelines to determine whether research participants give sufficient consent?
5. In emergency situations, to what extent can CABs provide consultation on what response researchers should have to the emergency?
6. When study participants have ethical problems with the research, to what extent should the CAB directly receive those participants' concerns?
7. When CABs perceive the inevitable lapses in sufficient protection for research participants which occasionally and naturally occur in any study, what power should the CAB have to direct rectification of this lapse?
8. To what extent should CABs direct the empowerment of their communities to more fully and beneficially participate in research?

== Guidelines ==
A community advisory board has whatever duties the members invest in it, but various organizations have suggested that they have certain responsibilities. Besides not knowing what CABs should do, it is difficult to determine what CABs should not do. Some of the perennial problems with CABs are determining the following: who in a community can serve on a CAB, the extent to which the CAB directs research, and the extent to which the community directs the execution of the research. Researchers find that research is more productive and ethical when researchers train, recruit, and integrate members from the population targeted by the research into the research team. In consulting with the community, researchers have to meet with individuals who represent a common culture, have a communication network with the community they represent, and have a system for voicing the community's priorities.

=== Overseeing genetic research ===
In 2000 the National Institute of General Medical Sciences held a conference which defined some CAB duties. Those duties are as follows:

1. Define community in appropriate and meaningful ways.
2. Understand the potential benefits and risks of research for communities and community members.
3. Obtain broad community input for all phases of research.
4. Respect communities as full partners in research.
5. Resolve all issues pertaining to tissue samples.
6. Establish appropriate review mechanisms and procedures.
7. Facilitate the return of benefits to communities.
8. Foster education and training in community-based research.
9. Ensure dissemination of accurate information to the media and the public.
10. Provide sufficient funds for research and encourage community–researcher partnerships.

== Challenges in developing countries ==
As part of international development many research institutions medical research in developing countries. When this happens, they often opt to get advice from the local community through a CAB. The process of setting up CABs in developing countries has its own problems.
