= Action research =

Methodology for social science research

Action research is a philosophy and methodology of research generally applied in the social sciences. It seeks transformative change through the simultaneous process of taking action and doing research, which are linked together by critical reflection. Kurt Lewin, then a professor at MIT, coined the term "action research" in 1944. In his 1946 paper "Action Research and Minority Problems" he described action research as "a comparative research on the conditions and effects of various forms of social action and research leading to social action" that uses "a spiral of steps, each of which is composed of a circle of planning, action and fact-finding about the result of the action".

== Process ==
Action research is an interactive inquiry process that balances problem-solving actions implemented in a collaborative context with data-driven collaborative analysis or research to understand underlying causes enabling future predictions about personal and organizational change.

After seven decades of action research development, many methods have evolved that adjust the balance to focus more on the actions taken or more on the research that results from the reflective understanding of the actions. This tension exists between:

1. those who are more driven either by the researcher's agenda or by participants;
2. those who are motivated primarily by instrumental goal attainment or by the aim of personal, organizational or societal transformation; and
3. 1st-, to 2nd-, to 3rd-person research, that is, my research on my own action, aimed primarily at personal change; our research on our group (family/team), aimed primarily at improving the group; and 'scholarly' research aimed primarily at theoretical generalization or large-scale change.

Action research challenges traditional social science by moving beyond reflective knowledge created by outside experts sampling variables, to an active moment-to-moment theorizing, data collecting and inquiry occurring in the midst of emergent structure. "Knowledge is always gained through action and for action. From this starting point, to question the validity of social knowledge is to question, not how to develop a reflective science about action, but how to develop genuinely well-informed action – how to conduct an action science". In this sense, engaging in action research is a form of problem-based investigation by practitioners into their practice, thus it is an empirical process. The goal is both to create and share knowledge in the social sciences.

== Major theoretical approaches ==
=== Chris Argyris' action science ===
Chris Argyris' action science begins with the study of how human beings design their actions in difficult situations. Humans design their actions to achieve intended consequences and are governed by a set of environment variables. How those governing variables are treated in designing actions are the key differences between single-loop and double-loop learning. When actions are designed to achieve the intended consequences and to suppress conflict about the governing variables, a single-loop learning cycle usually ensues.

On the other hand, when actions are taken not only to achieve the intended consequences, but also to openly inquire about conflict and to possibly transform the governing variables, both single- and double-loop learning cycles usually ensue. (Argyris applies single- and double-loop learning concepts not only to personal behaviors but also to organizational behaviors in his models.) This is different from experimental research in which environmental variables are controlled and researchers try to find out cause and effect in an isolated environment.

=== John Heron and Peter Reason's cooperative inquiry ===
Cooperative, aka collaborative, inquiry was first proposed by John Heron in 1971 and later expanded with Peter Reason and Demi Brown. The major idea is to "research 'with' rather than 'on' people." It emphasizes the full involvement in research decisions of all active participants as co-researchers.

Cooperative inquiry creates a research cycle among 4 different types of knowledge: propositional (as in contemporary science), practical (the knowledge that comes with actually doing what you propose), experiential (the real-time feedback we get about our interaction with the larger world) and presentational (the artistic rehearsal process through which we craft new practices). At every cycle, the research process includes these four stages, with deepening experience and knowledge of the initial proposition, or of new propositions.

=== Paulo Freire's participatory action research ===
Participatory action research builds on the critical pedagogy put forward by Paulo Freire as a response to the traditional formal models of education where the "teacher" stands at the front and "imparts" information to the "students" who are passive recipients. This was further developed in "adult education" models throughout Latin America.

Orlando Fals-Borda (1925–2008), Colombian sociologist and political activist, was one of the principal promoters of participatory action research (IAP in Spanish) in Latin America. He published a "double history of the coast", book that compares the official "history" and the non-official "story" of the north coast of Colombia.

=== Action research in organization development ===
Wendell L. French and Cecil Bell define organization development (OD) at one point as "organization improvement through action research". If one idea can be said to summarize OD's underlying philosophy, it would be action research as it was conceptualized by Kurt Lewin and later elaborated and expanded on by other behavioral scientists. Concerned with social change and, more particularly, with effective, permanent social change, Lewin believed that the motivation to change was strongly related to action: If people are active in decisions affecting them, they are more likely to adopt new ways. "Rational social management", he said, "proceeds in a spiral of steps, each of which is composed of a circle of planning, action and fact-finding about the result of action".

- Unfreezing: first step.
- Changing: The situation is diagnosed and new models of behavior are explored and tested.
- Refreezing: Application of new behavior is evaluated, and if reinforcing, adopted.

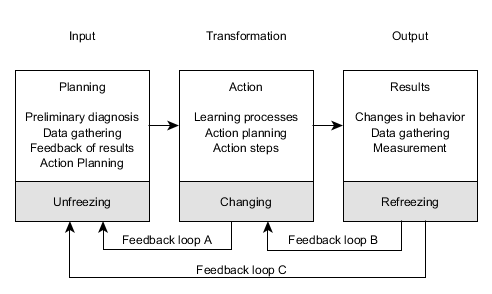
Figure 1: Systems model of action-research process

Lewin's description of the process of change involves three steps: Figure 1 summarizes the steps and processes involved in planned change through action research. Action research is depicted as a cyclical process of change.

1. The cycle begins with a series of planning actions initiated by the client and the change agent working together. The principal elements of this stage include a preliminary diagnosis, data gathering, feedback of results, and joint action planning. In the language of systems theory, this is the input phase, in which the client system becomes aware of problems as yet unidentified, realizes it may need outside help to effect changes, and shares with the consultant the process of problem diagnosis.
2. The second stage of action research is the action, or transformation, phase. This stage includes actions relating to learning processes (perhaps in the form of role analysis) and to planning and executing behavioral changes in the client organization. As shown in Figure 1, feedback at this stage would move via Feedback Loop A and would have the effect of altering previous planning to bring the learning activities of the client system into better alignment with change objectives. Included in this stage is action-planning activity carried out jointly by the consultant and members of the client system. Following the workshop or learning sessions, these action steps are carried out on the job as part of the transformation stage.
3. The third stage of action research is the output or results phase. This stage includes actual changes in behavior (if any) resulting from corrective action steps taken following the second stage. Data are again gathered from the client system so that progress can be determined and necessary adjustments in learning activities can be made. Minor adjustments of this nature can be made in learning activities via Feedback Loop B (see Figure 1).

Major adjustments and reevaluations would return the OD project to the first or planning stage for basic changes in the program. The action-research model shown in Figure 1 closely follows Lewin's repetitive cycle of planning, action, and measuring results. It also illustrates other aspects of Lewin's general model of change. As indicated in the diagram, the planning stage is a period of unfreezing, or problem awareness. The action stage is a period of changing, that is, trying out new forms of behavior in an effort to understand and cope with the system's problems. (There is inevitable overlap between the stages, since the boundaries are not clear-cut and cannot be in a continuous process).

The results stage is a period of refreezing, in which new behaviors are tried out on the job and, if successful and reinforcing, become a part of the system's repertoire of problem-solving behavior. Action research is problem centered, client centered, and action oriented. It involves the client system in a diagnostic, active-learning, problem-finding and problem-solving process.

== Worldwide expansion ==
Action research has become a significant methodology for intervention, development and change within groups and communities. It is promoted and implemented by many international development agencies and university programs, as well as local community organizations around the world, such as AERA and Claremont Lincoln in America, CARN in the United Kingdom, CCAR in Sweden, CLAYSS in Argentina, CARPED and PRIA in India, and ARNA in the Americas.

The Center for Collaborative Action Research makes available a set of twelve tutorials as a self-paced online course in learning how to do action research. It includes a free workbook that can be used online or printed.

== Journal ==
The field is supported by a quarterly peer-reviewed academic journal, Action Research, founded in 2003 and edited by Hilary Bradbury.

== See also ==
- Action learning
- Action teaching
- Appreciative inquiry
- Design research
- Learning cycle
- Lesson study
- Praxis intervention
- Reflective practice

== Bibliography ==
=== General sources ===
- Atkins, L & Wallace, S. (2012). Qualitative Research in Education. London: Sage Publications.
- Burns, D. 2007. Systemic Action Research: A strategy for whole system change. Bristol: Policy Press.
- Burns, D. 2015. Navigating complexity in international development: Facilitating sustainable change at scale. Rugby: Practical Action
- Davison, R., Martinsons, M., & Kock, N. (2004). Information Systems Journal, 14(1), 65–86.
- Greenwood, D. J. & Levin, M., Introduction to action research: social research for social change, Thousand Oaks, California: Sage Publications, 1998.
- Greenwood, D. J. & Levin, M., Introduction to action research. Second edition, Thousand Oaks, Calif.: Sage Publications, 2007.
- Martyn Hammersley, "Action research: a contradiction in terms?", Oxford Review of Education, 30, 2, 165–181, 2004.
- James, E. Alana; Milenkiewicz, Margaret T.; Bucknam, Alan. Participatory Action Research for Educational Leadership: Using Data-Driven Decision Making to Improve Schools. Thousand Oaks: Sage, 2007. ISBN 978-1-4129-3777-1
- Noffke, S. & Somekh, B. (Ed.) (2009) The SAGE Handbook of Educational Action Research. London: SAGE. ISBN 978-1-4129-4708-4.
- Pine, Gerald J. (2008). Teacher Action Research: Building Knowledge Democracies, Sage Publications.
- Reason, P. & Bradbury, H., (Ed.) The SAGE Handbook of Action Research. Participative Inquiry and Practice. 1st Edition. London: Sage, 2001. ISBN 0-7619-6645-5. (2nd Edition, 2007. ISBN 978-1-4129-2029-2)
- Rowell, L., Bruce, C., Shosh, J. M., & Riel, M. (2017). The Palgrave international handbook of action research. New York, NY: Palgrave Macmillan.
- Sherman & Torbert, Transforming Social Inquiry, Transforming Social Action: New paradigms for crossing the theory/practice divide in universities and communities. Boston, Kluwer, 2000.
- Silverman, Robert Mark, Henry L. Taylor Jr. and Christopher G. Crawford. 2008. "The Role of Citizen Participation and Action Research Principles in Main Street Revitalization: An Analysis of a Local Planning Project", Action Research 6(1): 69–93.
- Sagor, R. (2010). Collaborative Action Research for Professional. Learning Communities. Bloomington: Solution Tree Press.
- Stringer, E.T. And Ortiz, A. (2021). Action Research. Thousand Oaks, CA: Sage Publications.
- Wood, L., Zuber-Skerritt, O. (2013). "PALAR as a methodology for community engagement by faculties of education". South African Journal of Education, 33, 1–15.
- Wood, L. (2017) "Community development in higher education: how do academics ensure their community-based research makes a difference?" Community Development Journal, Volume 52, Issue 4, Pages 685–701, https://doi.org/10.1093/cdj/bsv068
- Zuber-Skerritt, O., & Wood, L. (2019). Action Learning and Action Research: Genres and Approaches. Emerald (UK).
- Woodman & Pasmore. Research in Organizational Change & Development series. Greenwich CT: Jai Press.

=== Exemplars and methodological discussions ===
- Argyris, C. 1970. Intervention Theory and Method. Reading, Massachusetts: Addison-Wesley.
- Argyris, C. 1980. Inner Contradictions of Rigorous Research. San Diego, California: Academic Press.
- Argyris, C. 1994. Knowledge for Action. San Francisco, California: Jossey-Bass.
- Cameron, K. & Quinn, R. 1999. Diagnosing and Changing Organizational Culture. Reading, Massachusetts: Addison-Wesley.
- Center for Collaborative Action Research. 2022. Action Research Tutorials. https://www.ccarweb.org/
- Denscombe M. 2010. Good Research Guide: For small-scale social research projects (4th Edition). Open University Press. Berkshire, GBR. ISBN 978-0-3352-4138-5
- Dickens, L., Watkins, K. 1999. "Management Learning, Action Research: Rethinking Lewin". Vol. 30, Issue 2, pp. 127–140. <https://doi.org/10.1177/1350507699302002>
- Freire, P. 1970. Pedagogy of the Oppressed''. New York: Herder & Herder.
- Garreau, J. 2005. Radical Evolution: The promise and peril of enhancing our minds, our bodies – and what it means to be human. New York: Doubleday.
- Heikkinen, H., Kakkori, L. & Huttunen, R. 2001. "This is my truth, tell me yours: some aspects of action research quality in the light of truth theories". Educational Action Research 1/2001.
- Heron, J. 1996. Cooperative Inquiry: Research into the human condition. London: Sage.
- Kemmis, Stephen and McTaggart Robin (1982) The action research planner. Geelong: Deakin University.
- Kemmis, Stephen, McTaggart, Robin and Nixon, Rhonda (2014) The action research planner. Doing critical participatory action research. Springer.
- McNiff, J. & Whitehead, J. (2006) All You Need To Know About Action Research, London; Sage.
- Ogilvy, J. 2000. Creating Better Futures: Scenario planning as a tool for a better tomorrow. Oxford: Oxford University Press.
- Reason, P. & Rowan, J. 1981. Human Inquiry: A Sourcebook of New Paradigm Research. London: Wiley.
- Reason, P. 1995. Participation in Human Inquiry. London: Sage.
- Schein, E. 1999. Process Consultation Revisited. Reading, Massachusetts: Addison-Wesley.
- Senge, P., Scharmer, C., Jaworski, J., & Flowers, B. 2004. Presence: Human purpose and the field of the future. Cambridge, Massachusetts: Society for Organizational Learning.
- Susman G.I. and Evered R.D., 1978. "Administrative Science Quarterly, An Assessment of the Scientific Merits of Action Research". Vol. 23, No. 4, pp. 582–603 JSTOR 2392581
- Torbert, W. & Associates 2004. Action Inquiry: The Secret of Timely and Transforming Leadership.

=== First-person research/practice exemplars ===
- Bateson, M. 1984. With a Daughter's Eye: A Memoir of Margaret Mead and Gregory Bateson. New York: Plume/Penguin.
- Cuomo, N. (1982). Handicaps 'gravi' a scuola - interroghiamo l'esperienza. Bologna: Nuova Casa Editrice L. Capelli.
- Cuomo, N. (2007). Verso una scuola dell'emozione di conoscere. Il futuro insegnante, insegnante del futuro. Pisa: Edizioni ETS.
- Harrison, R. 1995. Consultant's Journey. San Francisco: Jossey-Bass
- Raine, N. 1998. After Silence: Rape and My Journey Back. New York: Crown.
- Todhunter, C. 2001. "Undertaking Action Research: Negotiating the Road Ahead", Social Research Update, Issue 34, Autumn.

=== Philosophical sources ===
- Abram, D. 1996. The Spell of the Sensuous. New York: Vintage.
- Argyris, C. Putnam, R. & Smith, D. 1985. Action Science: Concepts, methods and skills for research and intervention. San Francisco: Jossey-Bass.
- Gadamer, H. 1982. Truth and Method. New York: Crossroad.
- Habermas, J. 1984/1987. The Theory of Communicative Action, Vol.s I & II. Boston:Beacon.
- Hallward, P. 2003. Badiou: A subject to truth. Minneapolis: University of Minnesota Press.
- Lewin, G.W. (Ed.) (1948). Resolving social conflicts. New York, NY: Harper & Row. (Collection of articles by Kurt Lewin)
- Lewin, K. (1946) "Action research and minority problems". J Soc. Issues 2(4): 34–46.
- Malin, S. 2001. Nature Loves to Hide: Quantum physics and the nature of reality, a Western perspective. Oxford: Oxford University Press.
- McNiff, J. (2013) Action Research: Principles and practice. New York: Routledge.
- Polanyi, M. 1958. Personal Knowledge. New York: Harper.
- Senge, P. 1990. The Fifth Discipline. New York: Doubleday Currency.
- Torbert, W. 1991. The Power of Balance: Transforming Self, Society, and Scientific Inquiry.
- Varela, F., Thompson, E. & Rosch E. 1991. The Embodied Mind: Cognitive science and human experience. Cambridge MA: MIT Press.
- Whitehead, J. & McNiff, J. (2006) Action Research Living Theory, London; Sage. ISBN 978-1-4129-0855-9.
- Wilber, K. 1998. The Marriage of Sense and Soul: Integrating science and religion. New York: Random House
- Zuber-Skerritt, O., & Wood, L. (2019). Action Learning and Action Research: Genres and Approaches. Emerald (UK).

=== Scholarly journals ===
- Action Research
- The Journal of Applied Behavioral Science
- Management Learning
