= Participatory monitoring =

Collection of measurements undertaken by citizens

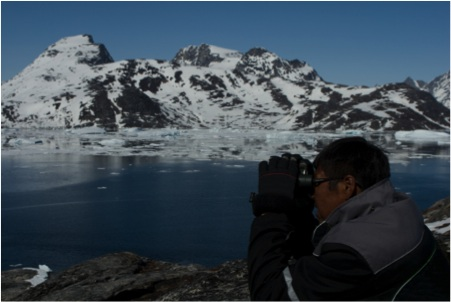
Scanning the sea off Greenland for seabirds as part of Greenland's documentation and management system PISUNA, a participatory monitoring programme

Participatory monitoring (also known as collaborative monitoring, community-based monitoring, locally based monitoring, or volunteer monitoring) is the regular collection of measurements or other kinds of data (monitoring), usually of natural resources and biodiversity, undertaken by local residents of the monitored area, who rely on local natural resources and thus have more local knowledge of those resources. Those involved usually live in communities with considerable social cohesion, where they regularly cooperate on shared projects.

Participatory monitoring has emerged as an alternative or addition to professional scientist-executed monitoring. Scientist-executed monitoring is often costly and hard to sustain, especially in those regions of the world where financial resources are limited. Moreover, scientist-executed monitoring can be logistically and technically difficult and is often perceived to be irrelevant by resource managers and the local communities. Involving local people and their communities in monitoring is often part of the process of sharing the management of land and resources with the local communities. It is connected to the devolution of rights and power to the locals. Aside from potentially providing high-quality information, participatory monitoring can raise local awareness and build the community and local government expertise that is needed for addressing the management of natural resources.

Participatory monitoring is sometimes included in terms such as citizen science, crowd-sourcing, 'public participation in scientific research' and participatory action research.

== Definition ==
The term 'participatory monitoring' embraces a broad range of approaches, from self-monitoring of harvests by local resource users themselves, to censuses by local rangers, and inventories by amateur naturalists. The term includes techniques labelled as 'self-monitoring', ranger-based monitoring', 'event-monitoring', 'participatory assessment, monitoring and evaluation of biodiversity', 'community-based observing', and 'community-based monitoring and information systems'.

Many of these approaches are directly linked to resource management, but the entities being monitored vary widely, from individual animals and plants, through habitats, to ecosystem goods and services. However, all of the approaches have in common that the monitoring is carried out by individuals who live in the monitored places and rely on local natural resources, and that local people or local government staff are directly involved in formulation of research questions, data collection, and (in most instances) data analysis, and implementation of management solutions based on research findings.

Participatory monitoring is included in the term 'participatory monitoring and management' which has been defined as "approaches used by local and Indigenous communities, informed by traditional and local knowledge, and, increasingly, by contemporary science, to assess the status of resources and threats on their land and advance sustainable economic opportunities based on the use of natural resources". term 'participatory monitoring and management' is particularly used in tropical, Arctic and developing regions, where communities are most often the custodians of valuable biodiversity and extensive natural ecosystems.

=== Alternative definitions ===
Other definitions for participatory monitoring have also been proposed, including:

1. "The systematic collection of information at regular intervals for initial assessment and for the monitoring of change. This collection is undertaken by locals in a community who do not have professional training".

Likewise, the term 'community-based monitoring of natural resources' has been defined as:

1. "A process where concerned citizens, government agencies, industry, academia, community groups and local institutions collaborate to monitor, track, and respond to issues of common community concern".
2. "Monitoring of natural resources undertaken by local stakeholders using their own resources and in relation to aims and objectives that make sense to them".
3. "A process of routinely observing environmental or social phenomena, or both, that is led and undertaken by community members and can involve external collaboration and support of visiting researchers and government agencies".

=== Limitations ===
It has been suggested that participatory monitoring is unlikely to provide quantitative data on large-scale changes in habitat area, or on populations of cryptic species that are hard to identify or census reliably. It has also been suggested that participatory monitoring is not suitable for monitoring resources that are so valuable they attract powerful outsiders. Likewise, in areas where changes, threats, or interventions operate in complex fashions, where rural people do not depend on the use of natural resources and there are no real benefits flowing to the local people from doing monitoring work (or the costs to local people of involvement exceed the benefits), or where there is a poor relationship between the authorities and the local people, participatory monitoring is probably less likely to yield useful data and management solutions than conventional scientific approaches.

== History ==
Whereas government censuses of human populations, which date perhaps to the 16th century B.C., were likely the first formal attempts at environmental monitoring, farmers, fishers and forest users have informally monitored resource conditions for even longer, their observations influencing survival strategies and resource use.

Participatory monitoring schemes are in operation on all the inhabited continents, and the approach is beginning to appear in textbooks.

=== Conferences ===
An international symposium on participatory monitoring was hosted by the Nordic Agency for Development and Ecology and the Zoology Department at Cambridge University in Denmark in April 2004. It led to a special issue of Biodiversity and Conservation October 2005.

In the Arctic, a symposium on data management and local knowledge was hosted by ELOKA and held in Boulder, USA, in November 2011. It led to a special issue of Polar Geography in 2014.

In the Arctic, three circumpolar meetings were held in 2013-2014:

- In November 2013 in Cambridge Bay, Nunavut, hosted by Oceans North Canada,
- In December 2013 in Copenhagen, Denmark, hosted by Greenland Department of Fisheries, Hunting and Agriculture, ELOKA, and Nordic Foundation for Development and Ecology,
- In March 2014 in Kautokeino, Norway, hosted by International Centre for Reindeer Husbandry, UNESCO and other partners.

The first global conference on Participatory Monitoring and Management was hosted by the Brazilian Ministry of Environment (MMA) and the Chico Mendes Institute for Biodiversity Conservation (ICMBio) and held in Manaus, Brazil in September 2014.

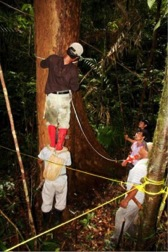
Villagers from Batu Majang village, east Kalimantan, Indonesia, measuring trees for participatory carbon monitoring under the I-REDD+ project. Photo: Michael Køie Poulsen

== Approaches ==
Thematically, participatory monitoring has considerable potential in several areas, including:

1. For connecting knowledge systems: in efforts to bring Indigenous and local knowledge systems into the science–policy interface such as the Intergovernmental Platform for Biodiversity and Ecosystem Services.
2. For monitoring rapidly changing environments: to inform resource management in rapidly changing environments such as the Arctic, where Indigenous and local communities have detailed knowledge of key components of their environment, such as sea-ice, snow, weather patterns, caribou and other natural resources.
3. In Payment for Ecosystem Services (PES) programs: to connect environmental performance with payment schemes such as REDD+.
4. For reinforcing international agreements: in efforts to link international environmental agreements to decision-making in the 'real world'.

=== Typology ===
A typology of monitoring schemes has been proposed, determined on the basis of relative contributions of local stakeholders and professional researchers. and supported by findings from statistical analysis of published schemes. The typology identified 5 categories of monitoring schemes that between them span the full spectrum of natural resource monitoring protocols:

Category A. Autonomous Local Monitoring. In this category the whole monitoring process—from design, to data collection, to analysis, and finally to use of data for management decisions—is carried out autonomously by local stakeholders. There is no direct involvement of external agencies. For an example see.

Category B. Collaborative Monitoring with Local Data Interpretation. In these schemes, the original initiative was taken by scientists but local stakeholders collect, process and interpret the data, although external scientists may provide advice and training. The original data collected by local people remain in the area being monitored, which helps create local ownership of the scheme and its results, but copies of the data may be sent to professional researchers for in-depth or larger-scale analysis. Examples are included in.

Category C. Collaborative Monitoring with External Data Interpretation. The third most distinct group is monitoring scheme category C. These schemes were designed by scientists who also analyse the data, but the local stakeholders collect the data, take decisions on the basis of the findings and carry out the management interventions emanating from the monitoring scheme. Examples are provided in.

Category D. Externally Driven Monitoring with Local Data Collectors. This category of monitoring scheme involves local stakeholders only in data collection. The design, analysis, and interpretation of the monitoring results are undertaken by professional researchers—generally far from the site. Monitoring schemes of category D are mostly long-running 'citizen science' projects from Europe and North America. See for example

Category E. Externally Driven, Professionally Executed Monitoring. Monitoring schemes of category E do not involve local stakeholders. Design of the scheme, analysis of the results, and management decisions derived from these analyses are all undertaken by professional scientists funded by external agencies. An example is

== The use of technology for participatory monitoring ==
Traditional methods of data collection for participatory monitoring use paper and pen. This has advantages in terms of low cost of materials and training, simplicity, and reduced potential for technical hitches. However, all data must be transcribed for analysis, which takes time and can be subject to transcription errors. Increasingly, participatory monitoring initiatives incorporate technology, from GPS recorders to georeference the data collected on paper, to drones to survey remote areas, phones to send simple reports via SMS, or smartphones to collect and store data. Various apps exist to create and manage data collection forms on smartphones (e.g. ODK, Sapelli and others).

Some initiatives find that the use of smartphones for data collection has advantages over paper-based systems. The advantages include that very little equipment need be carried on a survey, a large amount and variety of data can be stored (geographical locations, photos and audio, as well as data entered onto monitoring forms) and data can be shared rapidly for analysis without transcription errors. The use of smartphones can incentivise young people to get involved in monitoring, sparking an interest in conservation. Some apps are especially designed to be usable by illiterate monitors. If local people risk threats or violence by monitoring illegal activities, the true purpose of the phones can be denied, and the monitoring data locked away. However, phones are expensive; are vulnerable to damage and technical issues; necessitate additional training - not least due to rapid technological change; phone charging can be a challenge (especially under thick forest canopies); and uploading data for analysis is difficult in areas without network connections.

== Data sharing in participatory monitoring ==
A key challenge for participatory monitoring is to develop ways to store, manage and share data and to do this in ways that respect the rights of the communities that supplied the data. A 'rights-based approach to data sharing' can be based on principles of free, prior and informed consent, and prioritise the protection of the rights of those who generated the data, and/or those potentially affected by data-sharing. Local people can do much more than simply collect data: they can also define the ways that this data is used, and who has access to it.

Clear agreements on data sharing are especially important for initiatives where diverse data is collected, of variable relevance to different stakeholders. For example, monitoring could on the one hand, investigate sensitive social problems within a community, or contested resources at the centre of local conflicts or illegal exploitation - data that community leaders might want to keep confidential and address locally; on the other hand, the same initiative could generate data on forest biomass, of greater interest to external stakeholders.

One way to establish the rules around data sharing is to set up a data sharing protocol. This can define:

1. The infrastructure for data storage and management (computer programmes, hard drives and cloud storage). Local capacity should be strong enough to access, manage and retain control of the data.
2. Data classification: discussions in the communities can set out how different types of data can be used – for example a traffic light system can define 'red' data that is confidential to the community, 'amber' data which should be discussed prior to any use, and 'green' data that is approved for release.
3. Processes for data sharing: this defines the roles and responsibilities of different people, and the processes to be followed for requests to access data, dependent on how that data is classified.
4. Reporting: the protocol can set out how data should be reported, for example specifying the manner and frequency with which findings are reported to the local community, and ensuring that technical data is presented in a way that is compatible with external systems (e.g. government databanks or processes to respond to findings).

== See also ==
- Adaptive management
- Biodiversity
- Bioregion
- Conservation biology
- Conservation ethic
- Conservation movement
- Conservation reliant species
- Crowdmapping
- Crowdsourcing
- Ecology
- Ecosystem
- Environmental movement
- Environmental organizations
- Environmental protection
- Environmental resources management
- Environmental sociology
- Forestry
- Global warming
- Habitat conservation
- Holistic management
- Integrated landscape management
- Natural environment
- Natural resource
- Natural resource management
- Participatory action research
- Participation (decision making)
- Renewable energy
- Renewable resource
- Rural sociology
- Stewardship
- Sustainable agriculture
- Sustainable management
