= Community-based participatory research =

Research method

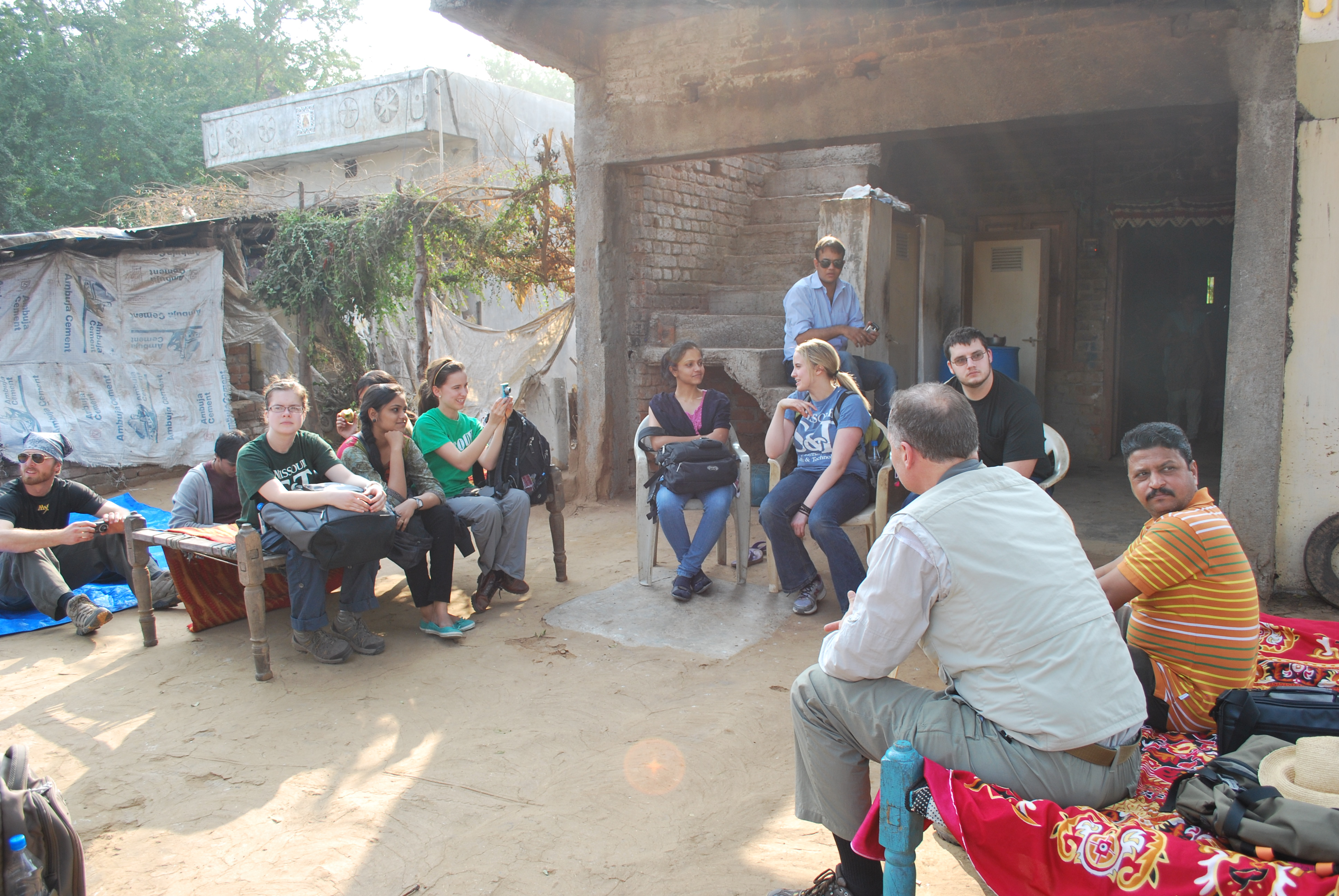
Daniel Oerther is leading a discussion with students and villagers to conduct a household interview in a village in rural Gujarat, India as part of a sanitary survey.

Community-based participatory research (CBPR) is an equitable approach to research in which researchers, organizations, and community members collaborate on all aspects of a research project. CBPR empowers all stakeholders to offer their expertise and partake in the decision-making process. CBPR projects aim to increase the body of knowledge and the public's awareness of a given phenomenon and apply that knowledge to create social and political interventions that will benefit the community. CBPR projects range in their approaches to community engagement. Some practitioners are less inclusive of community members in the decision-making processes, whereas others empower community members to direct of the goals of the project.

== History ==
The historical roots of CBPR trace back to the development of participatory action research by Kurt Lewin and Orlando Fals Borda, and the popular education movement in Latin America associated with Paulo Freire. Its most recent iteration includes Native American perspectives as provided by authors Nina Wallerstein, Bonnie Duran, John Oetzel, and Meredith Minkler in their pivotal work "Community-Based Participatory Research for Health: Advancing Social and Health Equity".

== Principles ==
CBPR offers nine guiding principles. These principles include: 1) acknowledging communities as "unities of identity", 2) building on existing community strengths and resources, 3) facilitating partnerships that are equitable, collaborative, empowering, and address social inequalities, 4) committing to co-learning and capacity building, 5) balancing knowledge generation and intervention to ensure mutual benefits for partners, 6) focusing on local issues of public concern, 7) utilizing a cyclical and repeatable process, 8) delivering results and knowledge to all partners, and 9) establishing sustainable, long-term partnerships with communities. Partnerships may use these principles to inform their studies, but are not required to adhere to them entirely. Instead, each partnership should discuss and decide on their own guiding principles to best reflect their collective vision.

== Process ==
CBPR is an iterative process, incorporating research, reflection, and action in a cyclical process. A CBPR project starts with the community, which participates fully in every aspect of the research process. "Community" is often self-defined, but common definitions of community include a geographic community, a community of individuals with a common problem, or a community of individuals with a common interest or goal. CBPR encourages collaboration between "experts" and communities, provided that the researchers are committed to sharing leadership and producing outcomes that are usable to the community that they intend to collaborate with. Equitable partnerships require sharing power, resources, knowledge, results, and credit. Mapping the groups that make up a community can reveal power relationships and create opportunities for relationship building. Ideally, stakeholders should be from different positions of the community so that changes are implemented at all different levels. The policies and policymakers connected to the community problem should be identified. The next stages of CBPR include identifying the problem, research design, conducting research, interpreting the results, and determining how the results should be used for action.

CBPR interventions can take many forms, including media or other educational campaigns, subsidized medical testing and healthcare programs, establishing quality standards for healthcare services as well as bonuses for healthcare providers who refer patients to CBPR-related services. Some projects involve training for young people to learn how to educate and advocate for change in their communities.

== Environmental justice ==
Community-based participatory research plays a meaningful role in the environmental justice movement. CBPR is a collaborative effort between researchers, academics, and environmental justice (EJ) communities. In the United States, EJ communities are characterized by residents who are people of color, low-income, non-native English speakers (linguistic isolation), or foreign born. Due to their intersecting racial, national, and class identities, EJ communities have little control capacity and are the targets of negative externalities by polluting corporations. CBPR takes a procedural justice approach to EJ issues, addressing the structural causes of environmental injustices and illuminating the power structures at play. CBPR often takes the form of empirical research, in which EJ community members observe environmental or health hazards in their communities and form hypotheses about the origins of these hazards. By bettering communities' understandings of the problems they face, CBPR supports environmental literacy and knowledge justice. Community-based research is more likely to trigger public action and engagement with environmental issues than traditional research. Bottom up community-based research in which community members oversee each phase of the research project is more likely to inspire structural reforms that are responsive to the needs of EJ communities.

== Research ==
CBPR research focuses on the relationships within the partnership and the overall goals, as opposed to strict research methods. Scholarship in the area of CBPR is vast and spells out various approaches which consider multiple theoretical and methodological approaches. The content areas include health, ethnic studies, bullying, environmental justice, and indigenous communities.

There is a lot of scholarship exploring how to teach students about CBPR or community-based research (CBR). Some have taken what could be called a critical approach to this by emphasizing the "institutional power inequalities" in community-based organization-university relationship building. There are successes and failures in using CBPR approaches in teaching, which practitioners can consider. Others have argued that community-based work can provide several learning benefits, with pros and cons to the various approaches. Scholars continue to problematize approaches that can engage instructors and students in imagining ways to work with communities.

== Research challenges ==
Scholarship has explored the potential barriers to collecting community-based participatory research data. The CBPR approach is in line with the body of sociological work that advocates for "protagonist driven ethnography". The approach provides for and demands that researchers collaborate with communities throughout the research process. However, challenges can surface given the power relationship between researcher and communities. The CBPR approach proposes that researchers be mindful of this possibility. The researcher can expect to spend a lot of time navigating and building the researcher-community relationship. Additionally, through CBPR, researchers enable communities to hold them accountable to addressing ethical concerns inherent to collecting information from what are often marginalized communities. Sociologists have entered the discussion from the point of view of the ethnographer or participant observer, where some have argued against "exoticizing the ghetto" or "cowboy ethnography". These works could be read as a check on the scholar centered work that can emerge when collecting ethnographic or participant observation data. The perception of researchers is something to weigh when considering this approach or other forms of field work. One researcher stated that "Researchers are like mosquitoes; they suck your blood and leave." Through this lens, a focus on a CBPR project at the exclusion of the community could harm the goals of co-learning and shared goal accomplishment.

== Applications ==
Applications of community-based participatory research are more common in medicine than other areas of research. Prevention, management, and awareness building about diabetes, HIV/AIDS, asthma, cancer, mental health, obesity, and HPV vaccination have been explored by CBPR studies. Because of its community-based, humanistic approach and public outreach potential, CBPR studies are commonly used with marginalized groups, such ethnic minorities and autistic people.

== Resources ==
There are a number of institutions that provide funding and other resources for CBPR studies. Organizations and institutions support CBPR by focusing on youth, and social justice. Networks of researchers, professionals, and activists collaborate on CBPR projects.
