= TGF beta signaling pathway =

Signaling pathway involving transforming growth factor beta proteins

The transforming growth factor beta (TGFβ) signaling pathway is involved in many cellular processes in both the adult organism and the developing embryo including cell growth, cell differentiation, cell migration, apoptosis, cellular homeostasis and other cellular functions. The pathway is also involved in multiple physiological processes such as regulation of the immune system, the vascular system and embryonic development. The TGFβ signaling pathways are conserved. In spite of the wide range of cellular processes that the TGFβ signaling pathway regulates, the process is relatively simple. TGFβ superfamily ligands bind to a type II receptor, which recruits and phosphorylates a type I receptor. The type I receptor then phosphorylates receptor-regulated SMADs (R-SMADs) which can now bind the coSMAD SMAD4. R-SMAD/coSMAD complexes accumulate in the nucleus where they act as transcription factors and participate in the regulation of target gene expression.

== Mechanism ==
=== Ligand binding ===
TGF Beta ligand binds to receptor

The TGF beta superfamily of ligands includes: bone morphogenetic proteins (BMPs), growth and differentiation factors (GDFs), anti-Müllerian hormone (AMH), Activin, Nodal and TGFβs. Signaling begins with the binding of a TGF beta superfamily ligand to a TGF beta type II receptor. The type II receptor is a serine/threonine receptor kinase, which catalyzes the phosphorylation of the Type I receptor. Each class of ligand binds to a specific type II receptor. In mammals there are seven known type I receptors and five type II receptors.

There are three activins: Activin A, Activin B and Activin AB. Activins are involved in embryogenesis and osteogenesis. They also regulate many hormones including pituitary, gonadal and hypothalamic hormones as well as insulin. They are also nerve cell survival factors.

The BMPs bind to the bone morphogenetic protein receptor type-2 (BMPR2). They are involved in a multitude of cellular functions including osteogenesis, cell differentiation, anterior/posterior axis specification, growth, and homeostasis.

The TGFβ family includes: TGFβ1, TGFβ2, TGFβ3. Like the BMPs, TGFβs are involved not only in embryogenesis and cell differentiation, but also in apoptosis and other functions. They bind to TGF-beta receptor type-2 (TGFβR2).

Nodal binds to activin A receptor, type IIB ACVR2B. It can then either form a receptor complex with activin A receptor, type IB (ACVR1B) or with activin A receptor, type IC (ACVR1C).

When the receptor-ligand binding occurs via local action, this is classified as paracrine signalling.

=== Receptor recruitment and phosphorylation ===
Type II receptor recruits type I receptor and phosphorylates

The TGF beta ligand binds to a type II receptor dimer, which recruits a type I receptor dimer forming a hetero-tetrameric complex with the ligand. These receptors are serine/threonine kinase receptors. They have a cysteine rich extracellular domain, a transmembrane domain, and a cytoplasmic serine/threonine rich domain. The GS domain of the type I receptor consists of a series of about thirty serine-glycine repeats. The binding of a TGFβ family ligand causes the rotation of the receptors so that their cytoplasmic kinase domains are arranged in a catalytically favorable orientation. The Type II receptor phosphorylates serine residues of the Type I receptor, which activates the protein.

=== SMAD phosphorylation ===
Type I receptor phosphorylates R-SMAD

There are five receptor regulated SMADs: SMAD1, SMAD2, SMAD3, SMAD5, and SMAD9 (sometimes referred to as SMAD8). There are essentially two intracellular pathways involving these R-SMADs. TGFβs, Activins, Nodals and some GDFs are mediated by SMAD2 and SMAD3, while BMPs, AMH and a few GDFs are mediated by SMAD1, SMAD5 and SMAD9. The binding of the R-SMAD to the type I receptor is mediated by a zinc double finger FYVE domain containing protein. Two such proteins that mediate the TGFβ pathway include SARA (the SMAD anchor for receptor activation) and HGS (Hepatocyte growth factor-regulated tyrosine kinase substrate).

SARA is present in an early endosome which, by clathrin-mediated endocytosis, internalizes the receptor complex. SARA recruits an R-SMAD. SARA permits the binding of the R-SMAD to the L45 region of the Type I receptor. SARA orients the R-SMAD such that serine residue on its C-terminus faces the catalytic region of the Type I receptor. The Type I receptor phosphorylates the serine residue of the R-SMAD. Phosphorylation induces a conformational change in the MH2 domain of the R-SMAD and its subsequent dissociation from the receptor complex and SARA.

=== CoSMAD binding ===
R-SMAD binds coSMAD

The now phosphorylated RSMAD has high affinity for coSMAD (e.g. SMAD4) and forms a complex with one. The phosphate group does not act as a docking site for coSMAD, but rather the phosphorylation opens up an amino acid stretch allowing interaction.

=== Transcription ===
R-SMAD-coSMAD complex enters nucleus

The phosphorylated RSMAD/coSMAD complex enters the nucleus where it binds transcription promoters/cofactors and causes the transcription of DNA.

Bone morphogenetic proteins cause the transcription of mRNAs involved in osteogenesis, neurogenesis, and ventral mesoderm specification.

TGFβs cause the transcription of mRNAs involved in apoptosis, extracellular matrix neogenesis and immunosuppression. They are also involved in G1 arrest in the cell cycle.

Activin causes the transcription of mRNAs involved in gonadal growth, embryo differentiation and placenta formation.

Nodal causes the transcription of mRNAs involved in left and right axis specification, mesoderm and endoderm induction.

== Pathway regulation ==
The TGF beta signaling pathway is involved in a wide range of cellular process and subsequently is very heavily regulated. There are a variety of mechanisms where the pathway is modulated either positively or negatively, including the agonists for ligands and R-SMADs, the decoy receptors, and the ubiquitination of R-SMADs and receptors.

=== Ligand agonists/antagonists ===
Both chordin and noggin are antagonists of BMPs. They bind BMPs preventing the binding of the ligand to the receptor. It has been demonstrated that Chordin and Noggin dorsalize mesoderm. They are both found in the dorsal lip of Xenopus and convert otherwise epidermis specified tissue into neural tissue (see neurulation). Noggin plays a key role in cartilage and bone patterning. Mice Noggin-/- have excess cartilage and lacked joint formation.

Members of the DAN family of proteins also antagonize TGF beta family members. They include Cerberus, DAN, and Gremlin. These proteins contain nine conserved cysteines which can form disulfide bridges. It is believed that DAN antagonizes GDF5, GDF6 and GDF7.

Follistatin inhibits Activin, which it binds. It directly affects follicle-stimulating hormone (FSH) secretion. Follistatin also is implicated in prostate cancers where mutations in its gene may preventing it from acting on activin which has anti-proliferative properties.

Lefty is a regulator of TGFβ and is involved in the axis patterning during embryogenesis. It is also a member of the TGF superfamily of proteins. It is asymmetrically expressed in the left side of murine embryos and subsequently plays a role in left-right specification. Lefty acts by preventing the phosphorylation of R-SMADs. It does so through a constitutively active TGFβ type I receptor and through a process downstream of its activation.

Drug-based antagonists have also been identified, such as SB431542, which selectively inhibits ALK4, ALK5, and ALK7.

=== Receptor regulation ===
The transforming growth factor receptor 3 (TGFβR3) is the most abundant of the TGF-β receptors yet, it has no known signaling domain. It however may serve to enhance the binding of TGFβ ligands to TGFβ type II receptors by binding TGFβ and presenting it to TGFβR2. One of the downstream targets of TGF β signaling, GIPC, binds to its PDZ domain, which prevents its proteasomal degradation, which subsequently increases TGFβ activity. It may also serve as an inhibin coreceptor to ActivinRII.

BMP and activin membrane bound inhibitor (BAMBI), has a similar extracellular domain as type I receptors. It lacks an intracellular serine/threonine protein kinase domain and hence is a pseudoreceptor. It binds to the type I receptor preventing it from being activated. It serves as a negative regulator of TGFβ signaling and may limit TGFβ expression during embryogeneis. It requires BMP signaling for its expression

FKBP12 binds the GS region of the type I receptor preventing phosphorylation of the receptor by the type II receptors. It is believed that FKBP12 and its homologs help to prevent type I receptor activation in the absence of a ligands, since ligand binding causes its dissociation.

=== R-SMAD regulation ===
==== Role of inhibitory SMADs ====
There are two other SMADs which complete the SMAD family, the inhibitory SMADs (I-SMADS), SMAD6 and SMAD7. They play a key role in the regulation of TGF beta signaling and are involved in negative feedback. Like other SMADs they have an MH1 and an MH2 domain. SMAD7 competes with other R-SMADs with the Type I receptor and prevents their phosphorylation. It resides in the nucleus and upon TGFβ receptor activation translocates to the cytoplasm where it binds the type I receptor. SMAD6 binds SMAD4 preventing the binding of other R-SMADs with the coSMAD. The levels of I-SMAD increase with TGFβ signaling suggesting that they are downstream targets of TGFβ signaling.

==== R-SMAD ubiquitination ====
The E3 ubiquitin-protein ligases SMURF1 and SMURF2 regulate the levels of SMADs. They accept ubiquitin from an E2 conjugating enzyme where they transfer ubiquitin to the RSMADs which causes their ubiquitination and subsequent proteosomal degradation. SMURF1 binds to SMAD1 and SMAD5 while SMURF2 binds SMAD1, SMAD2, SMAD3, SMAD6 and SMAD7. It enhances the inhibitory action of SMAD7 while reducing the transcriptional activities of SMAD2.

== Summary table ==
TGF-β ligands of H.sapiens highlighted in grey, of D.melanogaster ligands in pink, of C.elegans in yellow.

TGF-β superfamily ligand	Ligand inhibitors	Type II Receptor	Type I receptor	R-SMADs	coSMAD	I-SMADs
Activin A	Follistatin	ACVR2A	ACVR1B (ALK4)	SMAD2, SMAD3	SMAD4	SMAD7
GDF1		ACVR2A	ACVR1B (ALK4)	SMAD2, SMAD3	SMAD4	SMAD7
GDF11		ACVR2B	ACVR1B (ALK4), TGFβRI (ALK5)	SMAD2, SMAD3	SMAD4	SMAD7
BMP2-8	Noggin, Chordin, DAN	BMPR2	BMPR1A (ALK3), BMPR1B (ALK6)	SMAD1 SMAD5, SMAD8	SMAD4	SMAD6, SMAD7
Nodal	Lefty	ACVR2B	ACVR1B (ALK4), ACVR1C (ALK7)	SMAD2, SMAD3	SMAD4	SMAD7
TGFβs	LTBP1, THBS1, Decorin	TGFβRII	ACVRL1 (ALK1), TGFβRI (ALK5)	SMAD2, SMAD3	SMAD4	SMAD7
Dpp		Punt	Tkv	Mad	Medea	
Screw		Punt	Sax	Mad	Medea	
myoglianin		Wit	Baboon	dSmad2	Medea	
dActivin		Wit, Punt	Baboon	dSmad2	Medea	
Gbb		Wit, Punt	Tkv, Sax	Mad	Medea	
Daf-7		Daf-4	Daf-1	Daf-8, Daf-14	Daf-3	
Dbl-1		Daf-4	Sma-6	Sma-2, Sma-3, Sma-4	Sma-4	
