= SMAD =

SMAD may refer to:

- Soviet Military Administration in Germany, government of the Soviet occupation zone of Germany from May 1945 to October 1949
- Solvated metal atom dispersion, a method of producing nanoparticles
- SMAD (protein), proteins involved in cell signaling
  - I-SMAD, inhibitory SMAD proteins
  - R-SMAD, receptor regulated SMAD proteins
- Smad, Syria, a village in southern Syria
