= Zinc finger FYVE domain-containing protein 9 =

Protein found in humans

ZFYVE9

Identifiers
- Aliases: ZFYVE9, MADHIP, NSP, PPP1R173, SARA, SMADIP, zinc finger FYVE-type containing 9
- External IDs: OMIM: 603755; MGI: 2652838; GeneCards: ZFYVE9
Available structures
PDB	Human UniProt search: PDBe RCSB
PDB	List of PDB id codes 1DEV, 1MK2, 4BKW

Gene location (Human)
Chr.	Chromosome 1 (human)
Band	1p32.3	Start	52,142,089 bp
Band	1p32.3	End	52,348,671 bp

Gene location (Mouse)
Chr.	Chromosome 4 (mouse)
Band	4|4 C7	Start	108,494,663 bp
Band	4|4 C7	End	108,637,995 bp
RNA expression pattern
Bgee	Human / Mouse (ortholog); Top expressed in: Achilles tendon; prefrontal cortex; gastrocnemius muscle; cerebellar cortex; cerebellar hemisphere; islet of Langerhans; right hemisphere of cerebellum; muscle of thigh; internal globus pallidus; testicle / Top expressed in: skeletal muscle tissue; quadriceps femoris muscle; cerebellar cortex; muscle of thigh; dentate gyrus of hippocampal formation granule cell; primary visual cortex; hippocampus proper; superior frontal gyrus; zone of skin; hypothalamus; More reference expression data
BioGPS	n/a
Gene ontology
Molecular function	1-phosphatidylinositol binding; serine-type peptidase activity; protein binding; metal ion binding; protein domain specific binding
Cellular component	cytoplasm; endosome; early endosome; early endosome membrane; membrane; cytosol; intracellular membrane-bounded organelle; protein-containing complex
Biological process	endocytosis; transforming growth factor beta receptor signaling pathway; proteolysis; endosomal transport
Sources:Amigo / QuickGO
Orthologs
Databases	NCBI: entry; OMA: entry
Species	Human	Mouse
Entrez	9372	230597
Ensembl	ENSG00000157077	ENSMUSG00000034557
UniProt	O95405	n/a
RefSeq (mRNA)	NM_004799; NM_007323; NM_007324	NM_183300; NM_001347163; NM_001384118
RefSeq (protein)	NP_004790; NP_015563	n/a
Location (UCSC)	Chr 1: 52.14 – 52.35 Mb	Chr 4: 108.49 – 108.64 Mb
PubMed search
- Wikidata
View/Edit Human	View/Edit Mouse

Zinc finger FYVE domain-containing protein 9 or SARA (SMAD anchor for receptor activation) is a protein that in humans is encoded by the ZFYVE9 gene. SARA contains a double zinc finger (FYVE domain).

SARA is an anchoring protein involved in TGF beta signaling. It binds to the MH2 domain of the R-SMADs SMAD2 and SMAD3 as well as the type I TGF beta receptors. It facilitates the phosphorylation of the R-SMAD, which subsequently dissociates from SARA and the receptor and binds a coSMAD where they enter the nucleus as transcription factors.
