= Medea gene =

Gene found in fruit flies

SMAD family member 4

Identifiers
- Organism: Drosophila melanogaster (Fruit fly)
- Symbol: Med
- Alt. symbols: SMAD4
- Entrez: 43725
- Orthologs: NCBI: entry; OMA: entry
- RefSeq (mRNA): NM_079871
- RefSeq (Prot): NP_524610
- UniProt: O62609

Other data
- Chromosome: 3R: 31.61 - 31.62 Mb
Search for
- Structures: Swiss-model
- Domains: InterPro

Medea is a gene from the fruit fly Drosophila melanogaster that was one of the first two Smad genes discovered. For both genes, the maternal effect lethality was the basis for the selection of their names. Medea was named for the mythological Greek Medea, who killed her progeny fathered by Jason.

Both Medea and Mothers against dpp were identified in a genetic screen for maternal effect mutations that caused lethality of heterozygous decapentaplegic progeny. Because decapentaplegic is a bone morphogenetic protein in the transforming growth factor beta superfamily, identification of the fly Smad genes provided a much-needed clue to understand the signal transduction pathway for this diverse family of extracellular proteins. Humans, mice, and other vertebrates have a gene with the same function as Medea, called SMAD4. An overview of the biology of Medea is found at The Interactive Fly, and the details of Medea's genetics and molecular biology are curated on FlyBase.

Another laboratory used Medea as an acronym to describe a synthetic gene causing maternal effect dominant embryonic arrest. The formal genetic designation for maternal effect dominant embryonic arrest is P{Medea.myd88}; more details are in FlyBase.
