= BMPR2 =

Protein-coding gene in humans

Identifiers
- Aliases: BMPR2, BMPR-II, BMPR3, BMR2, BRK-3, POVD1, PPH1, T-ALK, bone morphogenetic protein receptor type 2
- External IDs: OMIM: 600799; MGI: 1095407; GeneCards: BMPR2
Available structures
PDB	Ortholog search: PDBe RCSB
PDB	List of PDB id codes 2HLQ, 3G2F
Enzyme activity
EC #	BRENDA	ExPASy	KEGG	MetaCyc
2.7.11.30	↗	↗	↗	↗

Gene location (Human)
Chr.	Chromosome 2 (human)
Band	2q33.1-q33.2	Start	202,376,327 bp
Band	2q33.1-q33.2	End	202,567,751 bp

Gene location (Mouse)
Chr.	Chromosome 1 (mouse)
Band	1|1 C2	Start	59,802,559 bp
Band	1|1 C2	End	59,918,173 bp
RNA expression pattern
Bgee	Human / Mouse (ortholog); Top expressed in: visceral pleura; lower lobe of lung; tendon of biceps brachii; urethra; lateral nuclear group of thalamus; parietal pleura; right lung; skin of thigh; skin of hip; tail of epididymis / Top expressed in: cumulus cell; ciliary body; iris; carotid body; right lung lobe; substantia nigra; molar; retinal pigment epithelium; pineal gland; epithelium of lens; More reference expression data
BioGPS	n/a
Gene ontology
Molecular function	transmembrane receptor protein serine/threonine kinase activity; ATP binding; protein serine/threonine kinase activity; activin receptor activity, type II; BMP binding; protein kinase activity; protein binding; kinase activity; growth factor binding; metal ion binding; nucleotide binding; transferase activity; BMP receptor activity; transforming growth factor beta-activated receptor activity; transforming growth factor beta receptor activity, type II; SMAD binding
Cellular component	integral component of membrane; caveola; spanning component of plasma membrane; dendrite; soma; membrane; cell surface; integral component of plasma membrane; plasma membrane; cytoplasm; basal plasma membrane; apical plasma membrane; extracellular space; nucleoplasm; postsynaptic density; receptor complex
Biological process	endothelial cell apoptotic process; positive regulation of epithelial cell migration; transmembrane receptor protein serine/threonine kinase signaling pathway; negative regulation of vasoconstriction; positive regulation of endothelial cell proliferation; endochondral bone morphogenesis; positive regulation of endothelial cell migration; lymphangiogenesis; positive regulation of pathway-restricted SMAD protein phosphorylation; anterior/posterior pattern specification; regulation of cell population proliferation; lung alveolus development; negative regulation of cell growth; transcription by RNA polymerase II; regulation of lung blood pressure; protein phosphorylation; positive regulation of axon extension involved in axon guidance; artery development; blood vessel remodeling; BMP signaling pathway; mesoderm formation; vascular endothelial growth factor receptor signaling pathway; signal transduction; proteoglycan biosynthetic process; positive regulation of cartilage development; maternal placenta development; endothelial cell proliferation; cellular response to starvation; negative regulation of DNA biosynthetic process; chondrocyte development; negative regulation of systemic arterial blood pressure; positive regulation of osteoblast differentiation; retina vasculature development in camera-type eye; cellular response to BMP stimulus; phosphorylation; venous blood vessel development; brain development; retina development in camera-type eye; positive regulation of BMP signaling pathway; limb development; positive regulation of bone mineralization; negative regulation of chondrocyte proliferation; lymphatic endothelial cell differentiation; mitral valve morphogenesis; pharyngeal arch artery morphogenesis; tricuspid valve morphogenesis; outflow tract septum morphogenesis; atrioventricular valve morphogenesis; activin receptor signaling pathway; cardiac muscle tissue development; outflow tract morphogenesis; endocardial cushion development; negative regulation of cell proliferation involved in heart valve morphogenesis; positive regulation of ossification; positive regulation of transcription by RNA polymerase II; ventricular septum morphogenesis; atrial septum morphogenesis; semi-lunar valve development; transforming growth factor beta receptor signaling pathway; pattern specification process; aortic valve development; pulmonary valve development
Sources:Amigo / QuickGO
Orthologs
Databases	NCBI: entry; OMA: entry
Species	Human	Mouse
Entrez	659	12168
Ensembl	ENSG00000204217	ENSMUSG00000067336
UniProt	Q13873	O35607
RefSeq (mRNA)	NM_001204; NM_033346	NM_007561
RefSeq (protein)	NP_001195	NP_031587
Location (UCSC)	Chr 2: 202.38 – 202.57 Mb	Chr 1: 59.8 – 59.92 Mb
PubMed search
- Wikidata
View/Edit Human	View/Edit Mouse

Bone morphogenetic protein receptor type II or BMPR2 is a serine/threonine receptor kinase encoded by the BMPR2 gene. It binds bone morphogenetic proteins, members of the TGF beta superfamily of ligands, which are involved in paracrine signaling. BMPs are involved in a host of cellular functions including osteogenesis, cell growth and cell differentiation. Signaling in the BMP pathway begins with the binding of a BMP to the type II receptor. This causes the recruitment of a BMP type I receptor, which the type II receptor phosphorylates. The type I receptor phosphorylates an R-SMAD, a transcriptional regulator.

== Function ==
Unlike the TGFβ type II receptor, which has a high affinity for TGF-β1, BMPR2 does not have a high affinity for BMP-2, BMP-7 and BMP-4, unless it is co-expressed with a type I BMP receptor. On ligand binding, a receptor complex is formed, consisting of two type II and two type I transmembrane serine/threonine kinases. Type II receptors phosphorylate and activate type I receptors which autophosphorylate, then bind and activate SMAD transcriptional regulators. They bind to BMP-7, BMP-2 and, less efficiently, BMP-4. Binding is weak but enhanced by the presence of type I receptors for BMPs. In TGF beta signaling all of the receptors exist in homodimers before ligand binding. In the case of BMP receptors only a small fraction of the receptors exist in homomeric forms before ligand binding. Once a ligand has bound to a receptor, the amount of homomeric receptor oligomers increase, suggesting that the equilibrium shifts towards the homodimeric form. The low affinity for ligands suggests that BMPR2 may differ from other type II TGF beta receptors in that the ligand may bind the type I receptor first.

== Oocyte development ==
BMPR2 is expressed on both human and animal granulosa cells, and is a crucial receptor for bone morphogenetic protein 15 (BMP15) and growth differentiation factor 9 (GDF9). These two protein signaling molecules and their BMPR2-mediated effects play an important role in follicle development in preparation for ovulation. However, BMPR2 can't bind BMP15 and GDF9 without the assistance of bone morphogenetic protein receptor 1B (BMPR1B) and transforming growth factor β receptor 1 (TGFβR1) respectively. There is evidence that the BMPR2 signaling pathway is disrupted in the case of polyendocrine metabolic ovarian syndrome (PMOS), possibly by hyperandrogenism.

It appears that the hormones estrogen and follicle stimulating hormone (FSH) have roles in regulating expression of BMPR2 in granulosa cells. Experimental treatment in animal models with estradiol with or without FSH increased BMPR2 mRNA expression while treatment with FSH alone decreased BMPR2 expression. However, in human granulosa-like tumor cell line (KGN), treatment with FSH increased BMPR2 expression.

== Clinical significance ==
At least 70 disease-causing mutations in this gene have been discovered. An inactivating mutation in the BMPR2 gene has been linked to pulmonary arterial hypertension.

BMPR2 functions to inhibit the proliferation of vascular smooth muscle tissue. It functions by promoting the survival of pulmonary arterial endothelial cells, therefore preventing arterial damage and adverse inflammatory responses. It also inhibits pulmonary arterial proliferation in response to growth factors, which prevents the closing of arteries by proliferating endothelial cells. When this gene is inhibited, vascular smooth muscle proliferates and can cause pulmonary hypertension, which, among other things, can lead to cor pulmonale, a condition that causes the right side of the heart to fail. The dysfunction of BMPR2 can also lead to an elevation in pulmonary arterial pressure due to an adverse response of the pulmonary circuit to injury.

It is especially important to screen for BMPR2 mutations in relatives of patients with idiopathic pulmonary hypertension, for these mutations are present in >70% of familial cases.

There have been studies which has correlated BMPR2 with exercise induced elevation of PA pressure by measuring tricuspid regurgitation velocity by echocardiography.
