= Ribonuclease IV =

Identifiers
- EC no.: 3.1.26.6
- CAS no.: 61536-76-3

Databases
- IntEnz: IntEnz view
- BRENDA: BRENDA entry
- ExPASy: NiceZyme view
- KEGG: KEGG entry
- MetaCyc: metabolic pathway
- PRIAM: profile
- PDB structures: RCSB PDB PDBe PDBsum
Search
- PMC: articles
- PubMed: articles
- NCBI: proteins

Ribonuclease IV (EC 3.1.26.6, endoribonuclease IV, poly(A)-specific ribonuclease) is an enzyme. This enzyme catalyses the following chemical reaction

Endonucleolytic cleavage of poly(A) to fragments terminated by 3'-hydroxy and 5'-phosphate groups

This enzyme forms oligonucleotides with an average chain length of 10.
