= SMAD9 =

Protein found in humans

Identifiers
- Aliases: SMAD9, MADH6, MADH9, PPH2, SMAD8, SMAD8A, SMAD8B, SMAD8/9, SMAD family member 9
- External IDs: OMIM: 603295; MGI: 1859993; GeneCards: SMAD9

Gene location (Human)
Chr.	Chromosome 13 (human)
Band	13q13.3	Start	36,844,831 bp
Band	13q13.3	End	36,920,765 bp

Gene location (Mouse)
Chr.	Chromosome 3 (mouse)
Band	3|3 C	Start	54,663,003 bp
Band	3|3 C	End	54,708,678 bp
RNA expression pattern
Bgee	Human / Mouse (ortholog); Top expressed in: corpus epididymis; caput epididymis; urethra; tail of epididymis; seminal vesicula; spinal ganglia; trigeminal ganglion; subthalamic nucleus; endometrium; superficial temporal artery / Top expressed in: female urethra; yolk sac; primary visual cortex; genital tubercle; cerebellar cortex; superior frontal gyrus; lumbar subsegment of spinal cord; amnion; chorion; dentate gyrus of hippocampal formation granule cell; More reference expression data
BioGPS	n/a
Gene ontology
Molecular function	DNA binding; DNA-binding transcription factor activity; metal ion binding; protein binding; DNA-binding transcription factor activity, RNA polymerase II-specific
Cellular component	SMAD protein complex; transcription regulator complex; intracellular anatomical structure; nucleoplasm; nucleus; cytoplasm; cytosol
Biological process	ureteric bud development; regulation of transcription, DNA-templated; SMAD protein signal transduction; cellular response to organic cyclic compound; hindbrain development; cellular response to BMP stimulus; BMP signaling pathway; transcription, DNA-templated; protein phosphorylation; cartilage development; bone development; transforming growth factor beta receptor signaling pathway; midbrain development; positive regulation of transcription from RNA polymerase II promoter involved in cellular response to chemical stimulus
Sources:Amigo / QuickGO
Orthologs
Databases	NCBI: entry; OMA: entry
Species	Human	Mouse
Entrez	4093	55994
Ensembl	ENSG00000120693	ENSMUSG00000027796
UniProt	O15198	Q9JIW5
RefSeq (mRNA)	NM_001127217; NM_005905; NM_001378621	NM_019483
RefSeq (protein)	NP_001120689; NP_005896; NP_001365550	NP_062356
Location (UCSC)	Chr 13: 36.84 – 36.92 Mb	Chr 3: 54.66 – 54.71 Mb
PubMed search
- Wikidata
View/Edit Human	View/Edit Mouse

SMAD family member 9 (also known as SMAD8, MADH6, and Mothers against decapentaplegic homolog 9) is a protein encoded by the SMAD9 gene. SMADs are a protein family that transduce receptors of the transforming growth factor beta (TGF-B) superfamily and are significant in regulating cell development. The name derives from two homologies: the "small" worm phenotype or Caenorhabditis elegans SMA and MAD family or "Mothers Against Decapentaplegic" of genes in the fruit fly Drosophila. SMAD9 is a critical "messenger" protein that translates extracellular signals into expression. The significance lies in how it dictates cell fate – signaling for synthesis/ growth, differentiation, or death – specifically within cardiovascular and skeletal systems.

== Nomenclature and classification ==
SMAD9 is also known as or referred to as Smad8/9, Smad8A, Smad8B, MADH9, MADH6, and PPH2. Within the overall SMAD group, there are three sub-types of the protein that consist of R-Smads (receptor-regulated), I-Smads (inhibitory), and Co-SMADs (common partner). R-Smads, which include Smad1, Smad2, Smad3, Smad5, and Smad 8/9 are integral in signaling for the TGF-B receptor. I-Smads include Smad6 and Smad7 which work to suppress the activity of R-Smads by binding to the TGF-B receptors, blocking them from reaching the receptor to get activated. Without the action of I-Smads, the TGF-B and BMP signaling pathways would remain perpetually active.

Before the name SMAD was created, the MAD (Mothers Against Decapentaplegic) genes were discovered in Drosophila (fruit flies). During Drosophila research, it was found that a mutation in the gene, MAD, in the mother, repressed the gene, decapentaplegic, in the embryo. The phrase "Mothers against" was added since mothers often form organizations opposing various issues e.g. Mothers Against Drunk Driving or (MADD); and based on a tradition of such unusual naming within the gene research community.

Subsequent discovery of the human version of this gene was named MADH and SMAD9 became cataloged as MADH6 or MADH9. The many aliases of SMAD9 are a result of conflict between species. In early TGF-B research, a gene was found in Xenopus (frogs) and dubbed Smad8. Simultaneously, other scientists found a similar gene in humans and called it SMAD8. Later analysis of these genes revealed that the human version was not a direct ortholog of the frog Smad8. To differentiate the two genomic classes and clear up confusion, the human gene name was altered to be SMAD9. The most up-to-date version of this name as distinguished by the scientific community is SMAD9 but the MADH versions still linger in publishing and papers as are synonymous. Additionally, SMAD8 is still the most common term used in dated literature.

== Structure ==
To understand the specific structure of SMAD9, it is crucial to grasp the overall organization of general SMAD proteins. SMADs are approximately 400 to 500 amino acids in length consisting of two globular regions at the amino and carboxy termini connected by a linker region, a short amino acid sequence that connects functional domains within a single protein maintaining structure and flexibility. This linker region plays an important role in protein function and regulation, specifically for R-Smads. The two regions are highly conserved in R-Smads with the MH1 at the N-terminus, involved in DNA binding and MH2 at the C-terminus, which is responsible for interaction with other Smads and the recognition of transcriptional co-activators and co-repressors.

R-Smads interact with DNA motifs on their N-terminus including the CAGAC and CAGCC variants. Receptor-phosphorylated R-Smads have the capability of forming heterotrimers via MH2 exchanges and these are believed to be effectors of TGF-B transcriptional regulation. R-Smads are phosphorylated in the nucleus at the linker domain by CDK8 and CDK 9 which alter the interaction of Smads with activators and repressors. Once an R-Smad is phosphorylated, the linker domain undergoes another phosphorylation modulation by GSK3 which labels Smads for their recognition by ubiquitin ligases and targets them for proteasome-mediated degradation after they carry out their role as transcription factors.

The structure of SMAD9 allows it to function as both a DNA binder and a protein-docking station. Breaking down the R-Smad morphological components more specifically, the MH1 domain (N-terminus) contains two key regions for DNA binding and nuclear localization. This region has a hairpin structure that allows it to bind to BMP-response elements (BREs) which are specific DNA sequences that mediate transcriptional responses to BMP signaling. Furthermore, this terminal holds the Nuclear Localization Signal (NLS) which allows SMAD9 to enter the nucleus once activated.

The MH2 domain (C-terminus) has three key constituents that prepare SMAD9 for interaction and activation to help unzip DNA and start the transcription process. The SSXS motif plays a key role in post-translational regulation of R-Smads. This motif is phosphorylated by Type I TGF-B and BMP receptors which initiates a conformational change that promotes R-Smad binding to Smad4 (the co-SMAD) via oligomerization, moving SMAD9 into the nucleus to regulate gene transcription.

== Function ==
The overarching function of SMADs, R-SMADs, and most specifically SMAD9 stem from their interaction with the transforming growth factor-B (TGF-B) superfamily. TGF-B signaling entails a complex network of check points and modulators including those involved in cell cycle progression, differentiation, reproductive function, development, wound-healing, motility, adhesion and immune monitoring. Once a holo-complex is formed, the TGF-B kinase domain can phosphorylate Smads. The R-Smads, including SMAD9, can form their heterotrimeric complexes with co-Smad like Smad4. This protein unit can then regulate transcription of target genes.

SMAD9 is a transcriptional modulator activated by bone morphogenetic proteins (BMPs)–growth factors that initiate the formation of new bone and cartilage by binding to and activating type 1 receptor kinase. Essentially, SMAD9 acts as a molecular relay switch. Once activated, SMAD9 moves into the nucleus to turn specific genes on or off. Although SMAD9 functions as a transcription factor, it dominates as a transducer, acting as a physical bridge between the cell membrane and the genome. This functional cycle begins when SMAD9 transforms a signal – where a protein binds to the appropriate receptor – into a significant cellular event of DNA transcription.

BMP ligands are a component of the TGF-B family that regulate bone formation, differentiation, and development. They form heterodimers which bind to Type I receptors such as ALK2 or ALK3, to activate intracellular SMAD signaling. The Type I receptors recognize a special, highly conserved portion of the MH2 domain called the L3 Loop. Other members of the SMAD family such as Smad2 and Smad3 have similar binding sites but with differing amino acids at important sequence positions; consequently, ALK2/3 will bypass them and solely bind to SMAD9. The receptor acts as a kinase–an enzyme that catalyzes phosphorylation– transferring phosphate groups to the SSXS motif at the C-terminal to release the protein into the cytoplasm. This phosphorylation event causes a conformational change in SMAD9 which can then bind with the co-SMAD, SMAD4, to form a heterotrimeric complex capable of entering the nucleus to carry out transcriptional modifications.

The SMAD9 complex continuously moves in and out of the nucleus as structural modifications either permit or prohibit its ability to influence target genes. The MH1 domain interacts with various Nuclear Pore Complexes via importin-beta, a transport receptor that translocates proteins from the cytosol to the nucleus. Once inside, the complex finds key genes where the beta-hairpin structure within the MH1 domain of SMAD9 inserts itself into the major groove of the DNA– the primary site for transcription factor binding. It then searches for a distinct BMP-response element (BRE) or a Smad Binding Element (SBE). The MH2 domain of SMAD9 recruits co-activators like p300 or Creb-binding protein (CBP) to unfasten chromatin, allowing RNA polymerase to begin synthesizing mRNA. SMAD9 also acts as a co-factor for the Drosha microprocessor complex to cleave primary miRNAs (non-coding RNA or introns) to precursor miRNAs that yield various RNA products such as mRNAs, tRNAs, and rRNAs.

== Clinical significance ==
There is an abundance of clinical research into the roles that the SMAD protein family plays in cancer progression, fibrosis, and genetic disorders, specifically co-SMADs and R-SMADs. The most well established clinical association for SMAD9 mutations involves Pulmonary Arterial Hypertension (PAH), a condition characterized by elevated blood pressure that, if left untreated, leads to right heart failure and most seriously death. While PAH is most commonly associated with mutations in the BMP type II receptor (BMPR2), this finding was unexpected; researchers believed that the loss of a functional SMAD9 in BMP signaling would be compensated by other R-Smads like Smad1 or Smad5. This led them to conclude that atypical microRNA processing– rather than standard gene transcription and signaling pathways– is the key driver of SMAD9- related PAH disorders. A pathogenic variation of SMAD9 prevents the maturation of growth-inhibitory miRNAs resulting in uncontrolled cell proliferation of smooth muscle cells that lie in cardiac organs. In a healthy pathway, BMPs signal SMAD9, microRNAs are produced, and halt cell growth when the threshold is reached. A mutation, however, completely wipes out this process and the cells' pulmonary arteries do not have the check point to know when to stop proliferating. The arterial walls consequently thicken and narrow, leading to dangerously high blood pressure levels. Furthermore, because SMAD9 is a key player in BMPs– which plays a vital role in mesenchymal stem cell and osteoblast differentiation– a mutation of this protein can lead to abnormal bone density phenotypes and impaired cartilage development.
