= SMAD7 =

Protein-coding gene in the species Homo sapiens

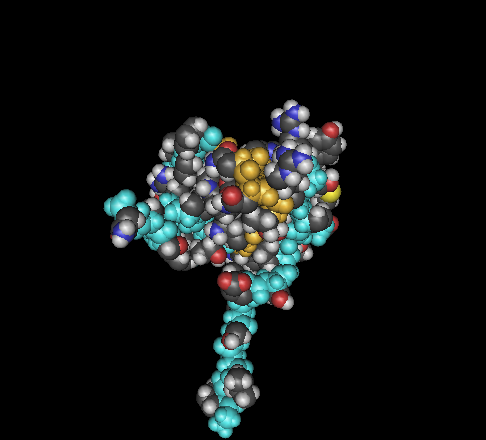

Identifiers
- Aliases: SMAD7, CRCS3, MADH7, MADH8, SMAD family member 7
- External IDs: OMIM: 602932; MGI: 1100518; GeneCards: SMAD7
Available structures
| PDB | Ortholog search: PDBe RCSB |
| PDB | List of PDB id codes 2DJY, 2LTV, 2LTW, 2LTX, 2LTY, 2LTZ, 2KXQ |

Gene location (Human)
| Chr. | Chromosome 18 (human) |
| Band | 18q21.1 | Start | 48,919,853 bp |
| Band | 18q21.1 | End | 48,950,965 bp |

Gene location (Mouse)
| Chr. | Chromosome 18 (mouse) |
| Band | 18|18 E3 | Start | 75,500,600 bp |
| Band | 18|18 E3 | End | 75,529,006 bp |
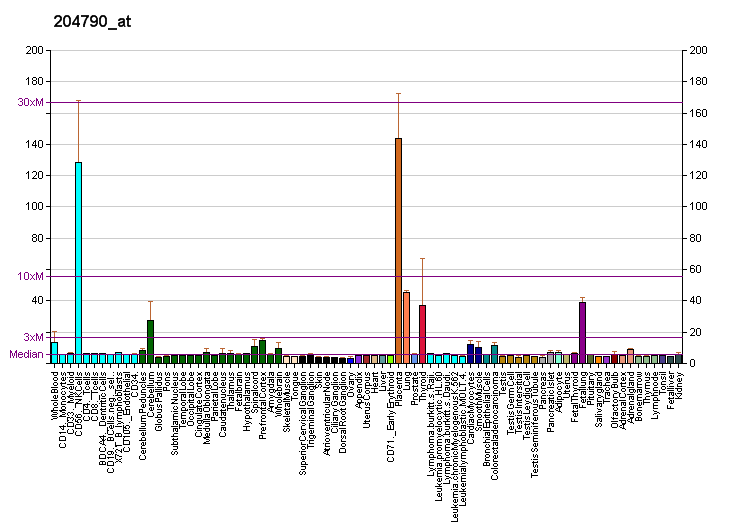
RNA expression pattern
| Bgee | Human / Mouse (ortholog); Top expressed in: popliteal artery; tibial arteries; saphenous vein; Descending thoracic aorta; right auricle of heart; ascending aorta; cardiac muscle tissue of right atrium; right lung; left coronary artery; right coronary artery / Top expressed in: molar; gastrula; left lung lobe; pyloric antrum; Gonadal ridge; decidua; cumulus cell; lumbar subsegment of spinal cord; substantia nigra; blood; More reference expression data |
| BioGPS | More reference expression data |
Gene ontology
| Molecular function | DNA binding; beta-catenin binding; type I transforming growth factor beta receptor binding; collagen binding; I-SMAD binding; activin binding; DNA-binding transcription factor activity; metal ion binding; protein binding; ubiquitin protein ligase binding; DNA-binding transcription factor activity, RNA polymerase II-specific |
| Cellular component | cytoplasm; centrosome; transcription regulator complex; plasma membrane; intracellular anatomical structure; nucleoplasm; catenin complex; nucleus; fibrillar center; cytosol; protein-containing complex |
| Biological process | cellular response to transforming growth factor beta stimulus; regulation of ventricular cardiac muscle cell membrane depolarization; pathway-restricted SMAD protein phosphorylation; ureteric bud development; regulation of transcription, DNA-templated; adherens junction assembly; positive regulation of cell-cell adhesion; ventricular septum morphogenesis; regulation of epithelial to mesenchymal transition; negative regulation of peptidyl-threonine phosphorylation; negative regulation of transcription by competitive promoter binding; response to laminar fluid shear stress; protein stabilization; regulation of activin receptor signaling pathway; negative regulation of transcription by RNA polymerase II; negative regulation of transforming growth factor beta receptor signaling pathway; BMP signaling pathway; negative regulation of DNA-binding transcription factor activity; negative regulation of pathway-restricted SMAD protein phosphorylation; negative regulation of BMP signaling pathway; ventricular cardiac muscle tissue morphogenesis; negative regulation of protein ubiquitination; negative regulation of cell migration; negative regulation of ubiquitin-protein transferase activity; artery morphogenesis; negative regulation of peptidyl-serine phosphorylation; regulation of cardiac muscle contraction; positive regulation of protein ubiquitination; positive regulation of proteasomal ubiquitin-dependent protein catabolic process; negative regulation of epithelial to mesenchymal transition; positive regulation of transcription by RNA polymerase II; regulation of transforming growth factor beta receptor signaling pathway; transcription, DNA-templated; transforming growth factor beta receptor signaling pathway; protein deubiquitination; negative regulation of T cell cytokine production; negative regulation of T-helper 17 type immune response; negative regulation of T-helper 17 cell differentiation; cellular response to leukemia inhibitory factor |
Sources:Amigo / QuickGO
Orthologs
| Databases | NCBI: entry; OMA: entry |
| Species | Human | Mouse |
| Entrez | 4092 | 17131 |
| Ensembl | ENSG00000101665 | ENSMUSG00000025880 |
| UniProt | O15105 | O35253 |
| RefSeq (mRNA) | NM_005904; NM_001190821; NM_001190822; NM_001190823 | NM_001042660; NM_008543 |
| RefSeq (protein) | NP_001177750; NP_001177751; NP_001177752; NP_005895 | NP_001036125 |
| Location (UCSC) | Chr 18: 48.92 – 48.95 Mb | Chr 18: 75.5 – 75.53 Mb |
| PubMed search |
- Wikidata
| View/Edit Human | View/Edit Mouse |

Mothers against decapentaplegic homolog 7 or SMAD7 is a protein that in humans is encoded by the SMAD7 gene.

SMAD7 is a protein that, as its name describes, is a homolog of the Drosophila gene: "Mothers against decapentaplegic". It belongs to the SMAD family of proteins, which belong to the TGFβ superfamily of ligands. Like many other TGFβ family members, SMAD7 is involved in cell signalling. It is a TGFβ type 1 receptor antagonist. It blocks TGFβ1 and activin associating with the receptor, blocking access to SMAD2. It is an inhibitory SMAD (I-SMAD) and is enhanced by SMURF2.

Smad7 enhances muscle differentiation.

== Structure ==
Smad proteins contain two conserved domains. The Mad Homology domain 1 (MH1 domain) is at the N-terminal and the Mad Homology domain 2 (MH2 domain) is at the C-terminal. Between them there is a linker region which is full of regulatory sites. The MH1 domain has DNA binding activity while the MH2 domain has transcriptional activity. The linker region contains important regulatory peptide motifs including potential phosphorylation sites for mitogen-activated protein kinases(MAPKs), Erk-family MAP kinases, the Ca2+ /calmodulin-dependent protein kinase II (CamKII) and protein kinase C (PKC). Smad7 does not have the MH1 domain. A proline-tyrosine (PY) motif presents at its linker region enables its interaction with the WW domains of the E3 ubiquitin ligase, the Smad ubiquitination-related factors (Smurf2). It resides predominantly in the nucleus at basal state and translocates to the cytoplasm upon TGF-β stimulation.

== Function ==
SMAD7 inhibits TGF-β signaling by preventing formation of Smad2/Smad4 complexes which initiate the TGF-β signaling. It interacts with activated TGF-β type I receptor therefore block the association, phosphorylation and activation of Smad2. By occupying type I receptors for Activin and bone morphogenetic protein (BMP), it also plays a role in negative feedback of these pathways.

Upon TGF- β treatment, Smad7 binds to discrete regions of Pellino-1 via distinct regions of the Smad MH2 domains. The interaction blocks the formation of the IRAK1-mediated IL-1R/TLR signaling complex therefore abrogates NF-κB activity, which subsequently causes reduced expression of pro-inflammatory genes.

While Smad7 is induced by TGF-β, it is also induced by other stimuli, such as epidermal growth factor (EGF), interferon-γ and tumor necrosis factor (TNF)-α. Therefore, it provides a cross-talk between TGF-β signaling and other cellular signaling pathways.

== Role in cancer ==
A mutation located in SMAD7 gene is a cause of susceptibility to colorectal cancer (CRC) type 3. Perturbation of Smad7 and suppression of TGF-β signaling was found to be evolved in CRC. Case control studies and meta-analysis in Asian and European populations also provided evidence that this mutation is associated with colorectal cancer risk.

TGF-β is one of the important growth factors in pancreatic cancer. By controlling the TGF-β pathway, smad7 is believed to be related to this disease. Some previous study showed over-expression of Smad7 in pancreatic cells but there was a recent study showed a low Smad7 expression. The role of Smad7 in pancreatic cancer is still controversial.

Over-expression or constitutive activation of epidermal growth factor receptor (EGFR) can promote tumor processes. EGF-induced MMP-9 expression enhances tumor invasion and metastasis in some kinds of tumor cells such as breast cancer and ovarian cancer. Smad7 exerts an inhibitory effect on the EGF signaling pathway. Therefore, it may play a role in prevention of cancer metastasis.

== Use in Pharmacology ==
SMAD7 signaling has been studied in a recent Celgene Phase III trial, NCT ID number 94, which interacts with the SMAD7 pathway. This drug (Mongersen) was studied in patients with Crohn's disease.

== Interactions ==
Mothers against decapentaplegic homolog 7 has been shown to interact with:

- CTNNB1,
- EP300,
- TAB1,
- PIAS4,
- RNF111,
- SMAD3.
- SMAD6,
- SMURF2,
- STRAP,
- TGFBR1, and
- YAP1.
