= I-SMAD =

Inhibitory SMAD proteins

I-SMAD or Inhibitor SMAD is a subclass of SMADs that are involved in the modulation of transforming growth factor beta ligands. This class includes SMAD6 and SMAD7. They compete with SMAD4 and consequently regulate the transcription of its gene products.

== See also ==
- SMAD (protein)
- R-SMAD
