= Gremlin (protein) =

Inhibitor protein in the TGF beta signaling pathway

gremlin 1, cysteine knot superfamily, homolog (Xenopus laevis)

Identifiers
- Symbol: GREM1
- Alt. symbols: CKTSF1B1
- NCBI gene: 26585
- HGNC: 2001
- OMIM: 603054
- RefSeq: NM_013372
- UniProt: O60565

Other data
- Locus: Chr. 15 q11-13
Search for
- Structures: Swiss-model
- Domains: InterPro

gremlin 2, cysteine knot superfamily, homolog (Xenopus laevis)

Identifiers
- Symbol: GREM2
- NCBI gene: 64388
- HGNC: 17655
- OMIM: 608832
- RefSeq: NM_022469
- UniProt: Q9H772

Other data
- Locus: Chr. 1 q43
Search for
- Structures: Swiss-model
- Domains: InterPro

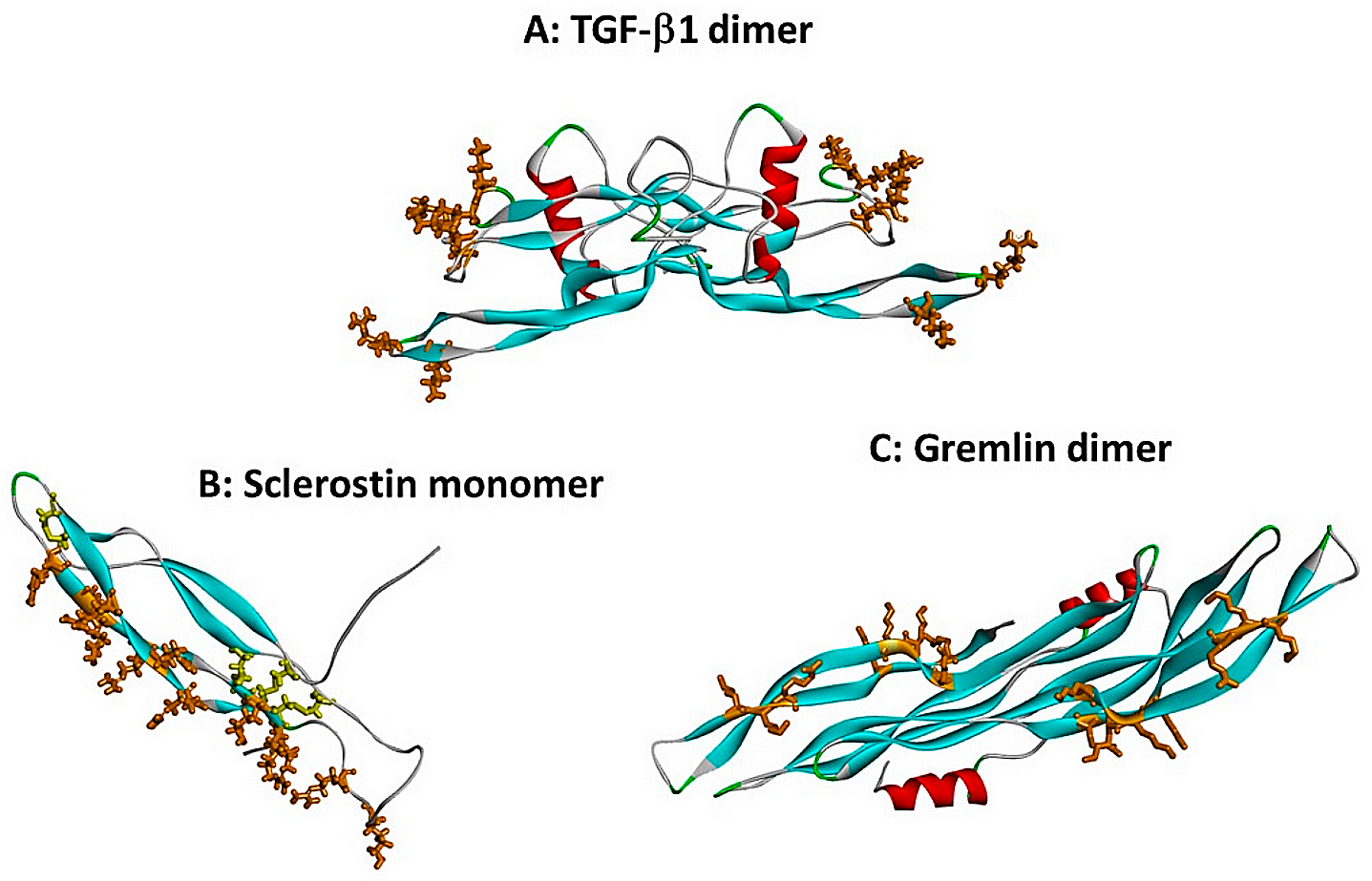
Heparin-binding sites on TGF-β superfamily cytokines. C: The dimer of the antagonist gremlin. Here, the heparin-binding residues (colored brown) are located largely along the second “finger.”

Gremlin is an inhibitor in the TGF beta signaling pathway. It primarily inhibits bone morphogenesis and is implicated in disorders of increased bone formation and several cancers.

== Structure ==
Gremlin1, previously known as Drm, is a highly conserved 20.7-kDa, 184 amino acid glycoprotein part of the DAN family and is a cysteine knot-secreted protein. Gremlin1 was first identified in differential screening as a transcriptional down-regulated gene in v-mos-transformed rat embryonic fibroblasts.

== Function ==
Gremlin1 (Grem1) is known for its antagonistic interaction with bone morphogenetic proteins (BMPs) in the TGF beta signaling pathway. Grem1 inhibits predominantly BMP2 and BMP4 in limb buds and functions as part of a self-regulatory feedback signaling system, which is essential for normal limb bud development and digit formation. Inhibition of BMPs by Grem1 in limb buds allows the transcriptional up-regulation of the fibroblast growth factors (FGFs) 4 and 8 and sonic hedgehog (SHH) ligands, which are part of the signaling system that controls progression of limb bud development. Grem1 regulation of BMP4 in mice embryos is also essential for kidney and lung branching morphogenesis.

== Fetal development ==
While GREM1 functions as a BMP antagonist during limb bud formation, it also functions as a pro-angiogenic molecule. As stated above, GREM1 is a member of the cysteine-knot superfamily similar to vascular endothelial growth factor (VEGF). Both molecules are capable of binding to the VEGF receptor to activate vascular differentiation and proliferation during development. In the absence of GREM1, it is possible to see unregulated bone growth as there is no inhibitory signal to regulate the bone morphogenetic proteins. Gremlin1 also plays a role in the epithelial-mesenchymal transition (EMT). Although this is an important process for neural tube development and other fetal structures, it is also a necessary process for tumor metastasis as it can activate the TGF beta pathway in the event of an overexpression of GREM1. This has made GREM1 the proposed target for cancer therapeutics, however, more research is necessary before any major steps are taken.

== Transcriptional regulation ==
Cis-regulatory modules (CRMs) regulate when and where Grem1 is transcribed. It has been reported that a CRM acts as both a silencer and activator for Grem1 transcription in the mouse limb bud. There are additional CRMs that regulate Grem1 transcription.

== Clinical significance ==
=== Cancer ===
Data from microarrays of cancer and non-cancer tissues suggest that grem1 and other BMP antagonists are important in the survival of cancer stroma and proliferation in some cancers. Grem1 expression is found in many cancers and is thought to play important roles in uterine cervix, lung, ovary, kidney, breast, colon, pancreas, and sarcoma carcinomas. More specifically, the Grem1 binding site (between residues 1 to 67) interacts with the binding protein YWHAH, (whose binding site for Grem1 is between residues 61–80) and is seen as a potential therapeutic and diagnostic target against human cancers.

Grem1 also plays a BMP-dependent role in angiogenesis on endothelium of human lung tissue, which implies a role for Grem1 in the development of cancer.

=== Bone ===
Deletion of Grem1 in mice after birth increased bone formation and increased trabecular bone volume, whereas overexpression causes inhibition of bone formation and osteopenia. Conditional deletion of one copy of Grem1 does not produce an abnormal phenotype and deletion of both copies causes only a small difference in phenotype in one-month-old male mice, but this difference cannot be observed after 3 months of age.

Grem1 plays an important role in bone development and a lesser known function later in adulthood. Overexpression of Grem1 decreases osteoblast differentiation or the inhibition of bone formation and the ability for bone remodeling. In addition, overexpression of Grem1 in the mouse limb bud inhibits BMP signaling which can lead to digit loss as well as polydactyly. Overexpression of grem1 in stromal and osteoblastic cells in addition to the inhibition of BMP, grem 1 inhibits activation of Wnt/β-catenin signaling activity. The interaction between Grem1 and the Wnt signaling pathway is not fully understood.
