= SMAD6 =

Protein-coding gene in the species Homo sapiens

Identifiers
- Aliases: SMAD6, AOVD2, HsT17432, MADH6, MADH7, SMAD family member 6
- External IDs: OMIM: 602931; MGI: 1336883; GeneCards: SMAD6

Gene location (Human)
Chr.	Chromosome 15 (human)
Band	15q22.31	Start	66,702,236 bp
Band	15q22.31	End	66,782,849 bp

Gene location (Mouse)
Chr.	Chromosome 9 (mouse)
Band	9|9 C	Start	63,860,358 bp
Band	9|9 C	End	63,929,341 bp
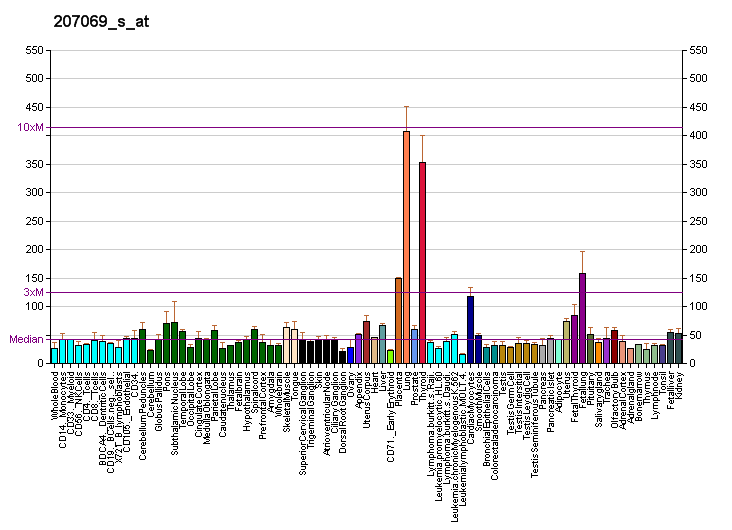

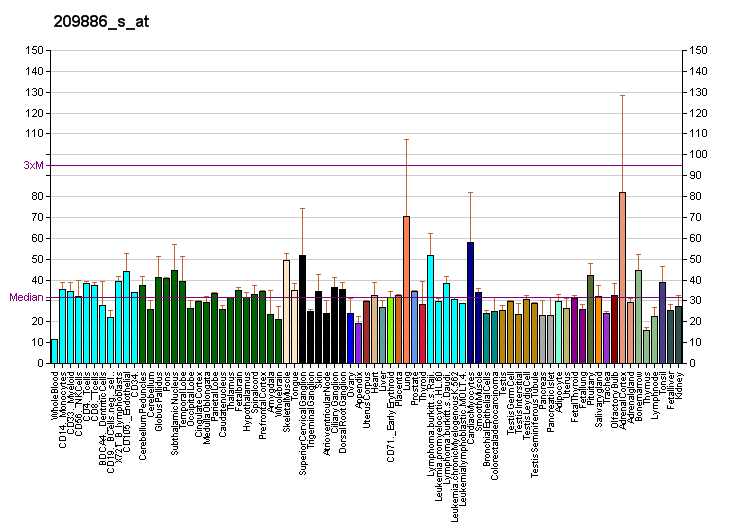
RNA expression pattern
Bgee	Human / Mouse (ortholog); Top expressed in: right lung; glomerulus; metanephric glomerulus; lower lobe of lung; right auricle of heart; upper lobe of lung; upper lobe of left lung; visceral pleura; Epithelium of choroid plexus; right lobe of thyroid gland / Top expressed in: right lung; right lung lobe; molar; atrium; mesorchium; epithelium of stomach; choroid plexus of fourth ventricle; external carotid artery; left lung; gastrula; More reference expression data
BioGPS	More reference expression data
Gene ontology
Molecular function	DNA binding; R-SMAD binding; type I transforming growth factor beta receptor binding; co-SMAD binding; I-SMAD binding; DNA-binding transcription factor activity; chromatin binding; type I activin receptor binding; metal ion binding; RNA polymerase II cis-regulatory region sequence-specific DNA binding; protein binding; identical protein binding; ubiquitin protein ligase binding; DNA-binding transcription factor activity, RNA polymerase II-specific
Cellular component	cytoplasm; transcription regulator complex; intracellular anatomical structure; nucleus; Golgi apparatus; cytosol; nuclear body; protein-containing complex
Biological process	ureteric bud development; heart valve development; regulation of transcription, DNA-templated; ventricular septum development; zygotic specification of dorsal/ventral axis; negative regulation of SMAD protein complex assembly; response to laminar fluid shear stress; negative regulation of apoptotic process; negative regulation of transforming growth factor beta receptor signaling pathway; coronary vasculature development; BMP signaling pathway; transcription, DNA-templated; negative regulation of pathway-restricted SMAD protein phosphorylation; response to estrogen; negative regulation of BMP signaling pathway; aorta development; cell-substrate adhesion; immune response; transforming growth factor beta receptor signaling pathway; fat cell differentiation; negative regulation of cell population proliferation; positive regulation of pri-miRNA transcription by RNA polymerase II; outflow tract septum morphogenesis; mitral valve morphogenesis; pulmonary valve morphogenesis; negative regulation of ossification; aortic valve morphogenesis; negative regulation of osteoblast differentiation; response to lipopolysaccharide
Sources:Amigo / QuickGO
Orthologs
Databases	NCBI: entry; OMA: entry
Species	Human	Mouse
Entrez	4091	17130
Ensembl	ENSG00000137834	ENSMUSG00000036867
UniProt	O43541	O35182
RefSeq (mRNA)	NM_001142861; NM_005585	NM_008542
RefSeq (protein)	NP_005576	NP_032568
Location (UCSC)	Chr 15: 66.7 – 66.78 Mb	Chr 9: 63.86 – 63.93 Mb
PubMed search
- Wikidata
View/Edit Human	View/Edit Mouse

SMAD family member 6, also known as SMAD6, is a protein that in humans is encoded by the SMAD6 gene.

SMAD6 is a protein that, as its name describes, is a homolog of the Drosophila gene "mothers against decapentaplegic". It belongs to the SMAD family of proteins, which belong to the TGFβ superfamily of modulators. Like many other TGFβ family members SMAD6 is involved in cell signalling. It acts as a regulator of TGFβ family (such as bone morphogenetic proteins) activity by competing with SMAD4 and preventing the transcription of SMAD4's gene products. There are two known isoforms of this protein.

== Nomenclature ==
The SMAD proteins are homologs of both the drosophila protein, mothers against decapentaplegic (MAD) and the C. elegans protein SMA. The name is a combination of the two. During Drosophila research, it was found that a mutation in the gene MAD in the mother repressed the gene decapentaplegic in the embryo. The phrase "Mothers against" was added as a humorous take-off on organizations opposing various issues e.g., Mothers Against Drunk Driving, or MADD; and based on a tradition of such unusual naming within the gene research community.

== Disease associations ==
Heterozygous, damaging mutations in SMAD6 are the most frequent genetic cause of non-syndromic craniosynostosis identified to date.

== Interactions ==
Mothers against decapentaplegic homolog 6 has been shown to interact with:

- HOXC8,
- MAP3K7,
- Mothers against decapentaplegic homolog 7,
- PIAS4, and
- STRAP.
