= Maternal effect dominant embryonic arrest =

"Selfish" gene in flour beetles

Maternal effect dominant embryonic arrest (Medea) is a flour beetle selfish gene composed of a toxin and an antidote. A mother carrying Medea will express the toxin in her germline, killing her progeny. If the children also carry Medea, they produce copies of the antidote, saving their lives. Therefore, if a mother has one Medea allele and one non-Medea allele, half of her children will inherit Medea and survive while the other half will inherit the non-Medea allele and die (unless they receive Medea from their father).

Medea's selfish behavior gives it a selective advantage over normal genes. If introduced into a population at sufficiently high levels, the Medea gene will spread, replacing entire populations of normal beetles with beetles carrying Medea. Because of this, Medea has been proposed as a way of genetically modifying insect populations. By linking the Medea construct to a gene of interest – for instance, a gene conferring resistance to malaria – Medea's unique dynamics could be exploited to drive both genes into a population. These findings have dramatic implications for the control of insect-borne diseases such as malaria and dengue fever.

== Construction ==
Medea, which has been found in nature only in flour beetles, is an example of a selfish gene that has been simulated in the lab and tested in the fruit fly Drosophila melanogaster. The toxin was a microRNA that blocked the expression of myd88, a gene vital for embryonic development in insects. The antidote was an extra copy of myd88. The offspring receiving the extra copy of myd88 survived and hatched, while those without the extra copy died. In lab trials where 25% of the original members were homozygous for Medea, the gene spread to the entire population within 10 to 12 generations.

== Etymology ==
Medea was named for the Greek mythological figure of Medea, who killed her children when her husband left her for another woman.

== See also ==
- Green-beard effect
- Intragenomic conflict
- Medea gene
- Toxin-antitoxin system
