= SMAD1 =

Protein found in humans

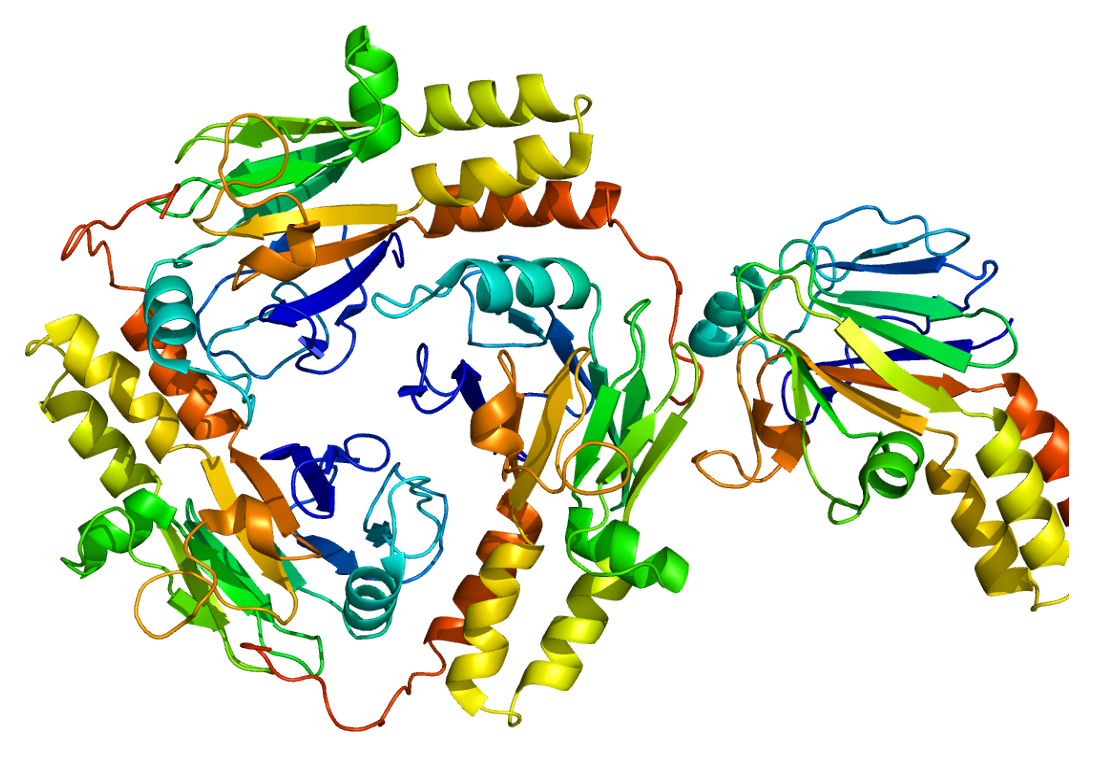

Identifiers
- Aliases: SMAD1, BSP-1, BSP1, JV4-1, JV41, MADH1, MADR1, SMAD family member 1
- External IDs: OMIM: 601595; MGI: 109452; GeneCards: SMAD1
Available structures
PDB	Ortholog search: PDBe RCSB
PDB	List of PDB id codes 1KHU, 2LAW, 2LAX, 2LAY, 2LAZ, 2LB0, 2LB1, 3Q47, 3Q4A

Gene location (Mouse)
Chr.	Chromosome 8 (mouse)
Band	8|8 C1	Start	80,065,024 bp
Band	8|8 C1	End	80,126,147 bp
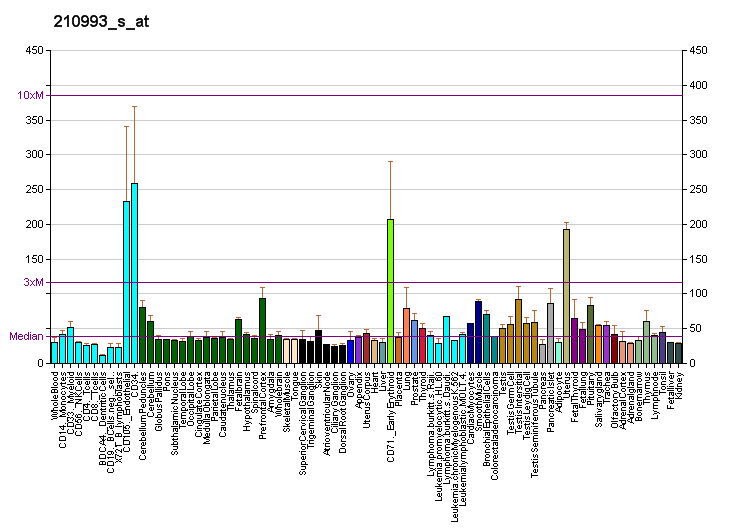
RNA expression pattern
Bgee	Human / Mouse (ortholog); n/a / Top expressed in: Ileal epithelium; Paneth cell; ureter; conjunctival fornix; fossa; endothelial cell of lymphatic vessel; medullary collecting duct; internal carotid artery; lacrimal gland; hair follicle
BioGPS	More reference expression data
Gene ontology
Molecular function	DNA binding; co-SMAD binding; protein homodimerization activity; I-SMAD binding; DNA-binding transcription factor activity; DNA-binding transcription activator activity, RNA polymerase II-specific; metal ion binding; protein binding; identical protein binding; protein heterodimerization activity; protein kinase binding; sequence-specific DNA binding; DEAD/H-box RNA helicase binding; primary miRNA binding; RNA polymerase II cis-regulatory region sequence-specific DNA binding; DNA-binding transcription factor activity, RNA polymerase II-specific
Cellular component	cytoplasm; integral component of membrane; SMAD protein complex; cytosol; transcription regulator complex; intracellular anatomical structure; nucleoplasm; nuclear inner membrane; nucleus; protein-containing complex
Biological process	positive regulation of transcription from RNA polymerase II promoter involved in cellular response to chemical stimulus; SMAD protein complex assembly; ureteric bud development; regulation of transcription, DNA-templated; SMAD protein signal transduction; embryonic pattern specification; regulation of transcription by RNA polymerase II; cellular response to organic cyclic compound; hindbrain development; cellular response to BMP stimulus; cardiac muscle cell proliferation; BMP signaling pathway; transcription, DNA-templated; MAPK cascade; protein phosphorylation; gamete generation; cartilage development; positive regulation of gene expression; positive regulation of osteoblast differentiation; positive regulation of cartilage development; primary miRNA processing; mesodermal cell fate commitment; inflammatory response; bone development; transforming growth factor beta receptor signaling pathway; midbrain development; signal transduction; negative regulation of cell population proliferation; positive regulation of transcription by RNA polymerase II; osteoblast fate commitment; homeostatic process; transcription by RNA polymerase II; positive regulation of pri-miRNA transcription by RNA polymerase II; protein deubiquitination; positive regulation of sprouting angiogenesis
Sources:Amigo / QuickGO
Orthologs
Databases	NCBI: entry; OMA: entry
Species	Human	Mouse
Entrez	4086	17125
Ensembl	ENSG00000170365	ENSMUSG00000031681
UniProt	Q15797	P70340
RefSeq (mRNA)	NM_001003688; NM_005900	NM_008539
RefSeq (protein)	NP_001003688; NP_005891; NP_001341740; NP_001341741; NP_001341742 NP_001341743; NP_001341745; NP_001341746	NP_032565
Location (UCSC)	n/a	Chr 8: 80.07 – 80.13 Mb
PubMed search
- Wikidata
View/Edit Human	View/Edit Mouse

Mothers against decapentaplegic homolog 1 also known as SMAD family member 1 or SMAD1 is a protein that in humans is encoded by the SMAD1 gene.

== Nomenclature ==
SMAD1 belongs to the SMAD, a family of proteins similar to the gene products of the Drosophila gene 'mothers against decapentaplegic' (Mad) and the C. elegans gene Sma. The name is a combination of the two; and based on a tradition of such unusual naming within the gene research community.

It was found that a mutation in the 'Drosophila' gene, MAD, in the mother, repressed the gene, decapentaplegic, in the embryo. Mad mutations can be placed in an allelic series based on the relative severity of the maternal effect enhancement of weak dpp alleles, thus explaining the name Mothers against dpp.

== Function ==
SMAD proteins are signal transducers and transcriptional modulators that mediate multiple signaling pathways. This protein mediates the signals of the bone morphogenetic proteins (BMPs), which are involved in a range of biological activities including cell growth, apoptosis, morphogenesis, development and immune responses. In response to BMP ligands, this protein can be phosphorylated and activated by the BMP receptor kinase. The phosphorylated form of this protein forms a complex with SMAD4, which is important for its function in the transcription regulation. This protein is a target for SMAD-specific E3 ubiquitin ligases, such as SMURF1 and SMURF2, and undergoes ubiquitination and proteasome-mediated degradation. Alternatively spliced transcript variants encoding the same protein have been observed.

SMAD1 is a receptor regulated SMAD (R-SMAD) and is activated by bone morphogenetic protein type 1 receptor kinase.

== Clinical significance ==
Loss-of-function mutation of SMAD1 is associated with congenital heart disease. It has autosomal dominant inheritance.
