= Solvated metal atom dispersion =

Solvated metal atom dispersion is a method of producing highly reactive solvated nanoparticles. Samples of a metal (or ceramic) are heated to evaporate free atoms (or species), as in PVD evaporation. This vapor is then co-deposited with a suitable organic solvent (e.g. toluene) at very low temperatures (on the order of 70K) to form a solid mixture of the two. This is then warmed towards room temperature, producing solvated metal atoms or (over time) larger clusters. Sometimes, catalyst supports (such as SiO_{2} or Al_{2}O_{3}) are added to improve nucleation, as the process can more readily take place on surface OH groups.
