= SMAD5 =

Protein-coding gene in the species Homo sapiens

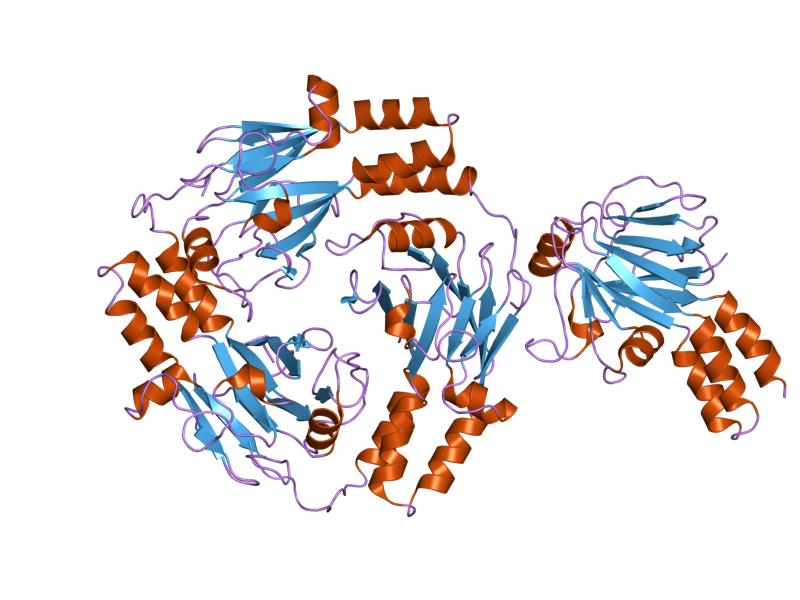

Identifiers
- Aliases: SMAD5, DWFC, JV5-1, MADH5, SMAD family member 5
- External IDs: OMIM: 603110; MGI: 1328787; GeneCards: SMAD5

Gene location (Human)
Chr.	Chromosome 5 (human)
Band	5q31.1	Start	136,132,845 bp
Band	5q31.1	End	136,188,747 bp

Gene location (Mouse)
Chr.	Chromosome 13 (mouse)
Band	13 B1|13 30.12 cM	Start	56,850,823 bp
Band	13 B1|13 30.12 cM	End	56,890,190 bp
RNA expression pattern
Bgee	Human / Mouse (ortholog); Top expressed in: mucosa of paranasal sinus; caput epididymis; tail of epididymis; lactiferous duct; corpus epididymis; nipple; germinal epithelium; superficial temporal artery; Achilles tendon; skin of hip / Top expressed in: genital tubercle; ventricular zone; tail of embryo; mandibular prominence; maxillary prominence; Paneth cell; stroma of kidney; ureter; medial ganglionic eminence; hair follicle; More reference expression data
BioGPS	n/a
Gene ontology
Molecular function	DNA binding; DNA-binding transcription factor activity; metal ion binding; protein binding; ubiquitin protein ligase binding; DEAD/H-box RNA helicase binding; RNA polymerase II transcription regulatory region sequence-specific DNA binding; RNA polymerase II cis-regulatory region sequence-specific DNA binding; DNA-binding transcription factor activity, RNA polymerase II-specific
Cellular component	SMAD protein complex; transcription regulator complex; intracellular anatomical structure; nucleoplasm; nucleus; cytoplasm; cytosol; protein-containing complex
Biological process	germ cell development; ureteric bud development; cardiac muscle contraction; regulation of transcription, DNA-templated; SMAD protein signal transduction; embryonic pattern specification; ossification; cellular response to organic cyclic compound; cellular response to BMP stimulus; BMP signaling pathway; transcription, DNA-templated; positive regulation of transcription, DNA-templated; Mullerian duct regression; protein phosphorylation; cartilage development; positive regulation of osteoblast differentiation; erythrocyte differentiation; bone development; transforming growth factor beta receptor signaling pathway; signal transduction; positive regulation of transcription from RNA polymerase II promoter involved in cellular response to chemical stimulus; positive regulation of transcription by RNA polymerase II; osteoblast fate commitment; negative regulation of transcription by RNA polymerase II
Sources:Amigo / QuickGO
Orthologs
Databases	NCBI: entry; OMA: entry
Species	Human	Mouse
Entrez	4090	17129
Ensembl	ENSG00000113658	ENSMUSG00000021540
UniProt	Q99717	P97454
RefSeq (mRNA)	NM_005903; NM_001001419; NM_001001420	NM_001164041; NM_001164042; NM_008541
RefSeq (protein)	NP_001001419; NP_001001420; NP_005894	NP_001157513; NP_001157514; NP_032567
Location (UCSC)	Chr 5: 136.13 – 136.19 Mb	Chr 13: 56.85 – 56.89 Mb
PubMed search
- Wikidata
View/Edit Human	View/Edit Mouse

Mothers against decapentaplegic homolog 5 also known as SMAD5 is a protein that in humans is encoded by the SMAD5 gene.

SMAD5, as its name describes, is a homolog of the Drosophila gene: "Mothers against decapentaplegic", based on a tradition of such unusual naming within the gene research community. It belongs to the SMAD family of proteins, which belong to the TGFβ superfamily of modulators. Like many other TGFβ family members SMAD5 is involved in cell signalling and modulates signals of bone morphogenetic proteins (BMP's). The binding of ligands causes the oligomerization and phosphorylation of the SMAD5 protein. SMAD5 is a receptor regulated SMAD (R-SMAD) and is activated by bone morphogenetic protein type 1 receptor kinase. It may play a role in the pathway where TGFβ is an inhibitor of hematopoietic progenitor cells.

== Clinical Significance ==
Variants of SMAD5 are associated with congenital heart disease. They have autosomal dominant inheritance due to either haploinsufficiency or dominant-negative effect.
