= R-SMAD =

Receptor regulated SMAD proteins

R-SMADs are receptor-regulated SMADs. SMADs are transcription factors that transduce extracellular TGF-β superfamily ligand signaling from cell membrane bound TGF-β receptors into the nucleus where they activate transcription TGF-β target genes. R-SMADS are directly phosphorylated on their c-terminus by type 1 TGF-β receptors through their intracellular kinase domain, leading to R-SMAD activation.

R-SMADS include SMAD2 and SMAD3 from the TGF-β/Activin/Nodal branch, and SMAD1, SMAD5 and SMAD9 from the BMP/GDP branch of TGF-β signaling.

In response to signals by the TGF-β superfamily of ligands these proteins associate with receptor kinases and are phosphorylated at an SSXS motif at their extreme C-terminus. These proteins then typically bind to the common mediator Smad or co-SMAD SMAD4.

Smad complexes then accumulate in the cell nucleus where they regulate transcription of specific target genes:

- SMAD2 and SMAD3 are activated in response to TGF-β/Activin or Nodal signals.
- SMAD1, SMAD5 and SMAD9 (also known as SMAD8) are activated in response to BMPs bone morphogenetic protein or GDP signals.

SMAD6 and SMAD7 may be referred to as I-SMADs (inhibitory SMADS), which form trimers with R-SMADS and block their ability to induce gene transcription by competing with R-SMADs for receptor binding and by marking TGF-β receptors for degradation.

== See also ==
- TGF beta signaling pathway
