= Poly(A)-specific ribonuclease =

Protein-coding gene in the species Homo sapiens

PARN
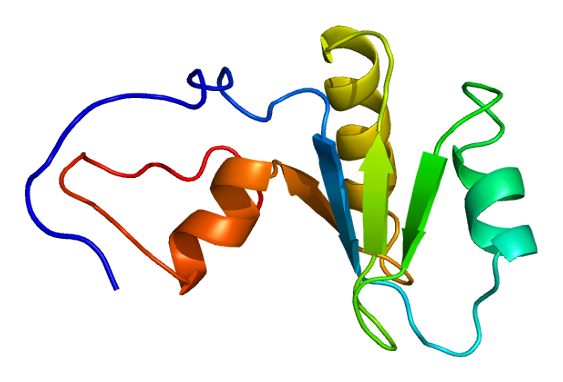

Identifiers
- Aliases: PARN, DAN, DKCB6, PFBMFT4, Poly(A)-specific ribonuclease
- External IDs: OMIM: 604212; MGI: 1921358; GeneCards: PARN
Available structures
PDB	Ortholog search: PDBe RCSB
PDB	List of PDB id codes 2A1R, 2A1S, 3CTR
Enzyme activity
EC #	BRENDA	ExPASy	KEGG	MetaCyc
3.1.13.4	↗	↗	↗	↗

Gene location (Human)
Chr.	Chromosome 16 (human)
Band	16p13.12	Start	14,435,700 bp
Band	16p13.12	End	14,632,728 bp

Gene location (Mouse)
Chr.	Chromosome 16 (mouse)
Band	16|16 A1	Start	13,355,824 bp
Band	16|16 A1	End	13,486,034 bp
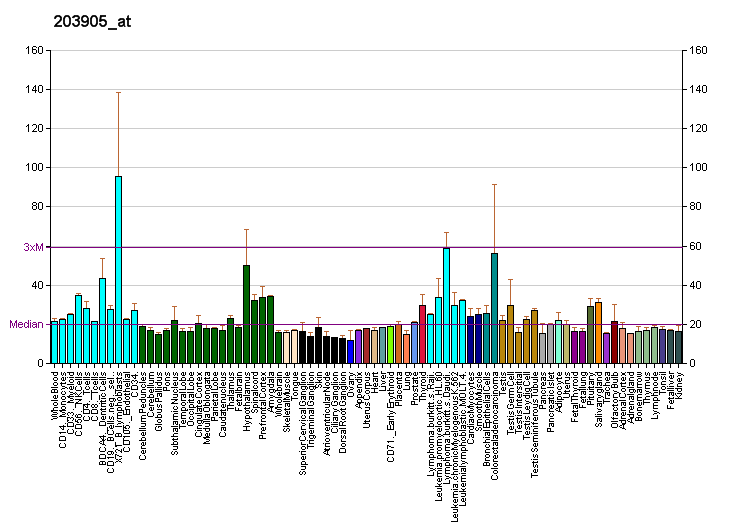
RNA expression pattern
Bgee	Human / Mouse (ortholog); Top expressed in: Achilles tendon; corpus callosum; testicle; tonsil; epithelium of colon; gonad; bone marrow cell; smooth muscle tissue; islet of Langerhans; urinary bladder / Top expressed in: aortic valve; ascending aorta; renal corpuscle; medullary collecting duct; Paneth cell; saccule; ectoderm; otic vesicle; otic placode; primitive streak; More reference expression data
BioGPS	More reference expression data
Gene ontology
Molecular function	metal ion binding; mRNA 3'-UTR binding; protein binding; nucleic acid binding; nuclease activity; exonuclease activity; hydrolase activity; protein kinase binding; cation binding; RNA binding; poly(A)-specific ribonuclease activity; telomerase RNA binding; 3'-5'-exoribonuclease activity
Cellular component	cytoplasm; cytosol; nucleolus; nucleus
Biological process	mRNA catabolic process; female gamete generation; regulation of mRNA stability; RNA modification; nuclear-transcribed mRNA catabolic process, nonsense-mediated decay; nuclear-transcribed mRNA poly(A) tail shortening; RNA phosphodiester bond hydrolysis, exonucleolytic; telomerase RNA stabilization; positive regulation of telomere maintenance via telomerase; positive regulation of telomerase activity; regulation of telomerase RNA localization to Cajal body; ncRNA deadenylation; box H/ACA RNA 3'-end processing; miRNA catabolic process; polyadenylation-dependent snoRNA 3'-end processing
Sources:Amigo / QuickGO
Orthologs
Databases	NCBI: entry; OMA: entry
Species	Human	Mouse
Entrez	5073	74108
Ensembl	ENSG00000140694; ENSG00000274829	ENSMUSG00000022685
UniProt	O95453	Q8VDG3
RefSeq (mRNA)	NM_001134477; NM_001242992; NM_002582	NM_028761; NM_001358452; NM_001358453
RefSeq (protein)	NP_001127949; NP_001229921; NP_002573	NP_083037; NP_001345381; NP_001345382
Location (UCSC)	Chr 16: 14.44 – 14.63 Mb	Chr 16: 13.36 – 13.49 Mb
PubMed search
- Wikidata
View/Edit Human	View/Edit Mouse

Poly(A)-specific ribonuclease (PARN), also known as polyadenylate-specific ribonuclease or deadenylating nuclease (DAN), is an enzyme that in humans is encoded by the PARN gene.

== Function ==
Exonucleolytic degradation of the poly(A) tail is often the first step in the decay of eukaryotic mRNAs. The amino acid sequence of poly(A)-specific ribonuclease shows homology to the RNase D family of 3'-exonucleases. The protein appears to be localized in both the nucleus and the cytoplasm. It is not stably associated with polysomes or ribosomal subunits. Hereditary mutations in PARN lead to the bone marrow failure disease dyskeratosis congenita which is caused by defective telomerase RNA processing and degradation in patients.
