= Mothers against decapentaplegic =

Protein

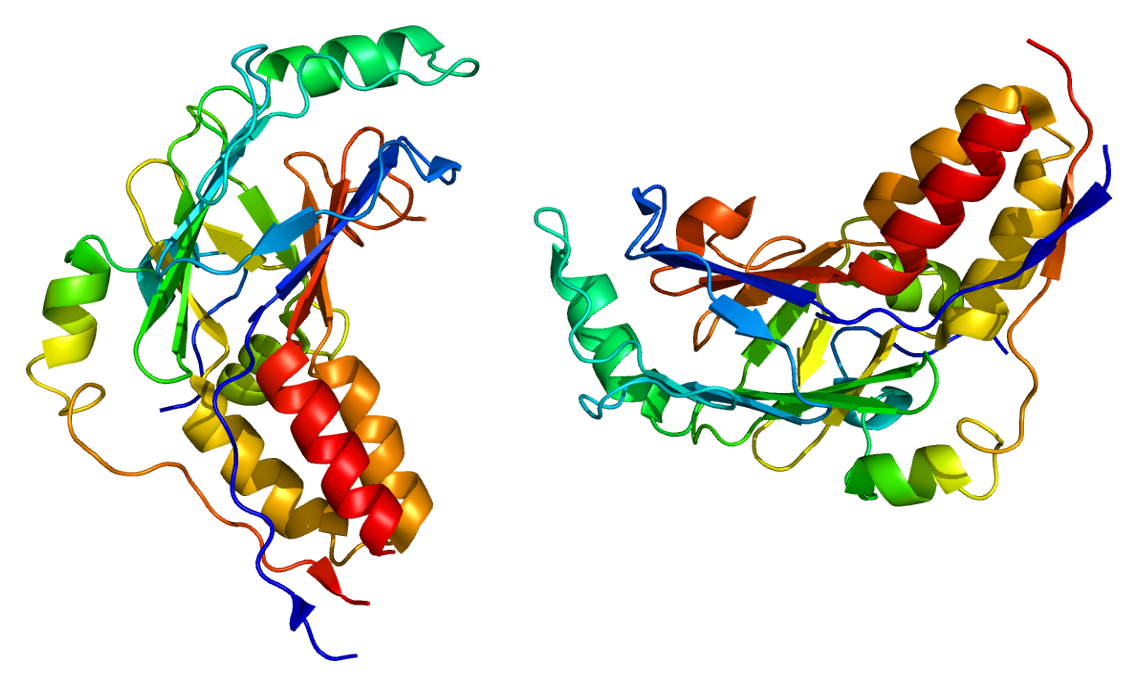
Mothers against decapentaplegic homolog 2, one of the nine homologues of mothers against decapentaplegic

Mothers against decapentaplegic is a protein from the SMAD family that was discovered in Drosophila. During Drosophila research, it was found that a mutation in the gene in the mother repressed the gene decapentaplegic in the embryo. The phrase "Mothers against" was added as a humorous take-off on organizations opposing various issues e.g. Mothers Against Drunk Driving (MADD); and based on a tradition of such unusual naming within the gene research community.

Several human homologues are known:

- Mothers against decapentaplegic homolog 1
- Mothers against decapentaplegic homolog 2
- Mothers against decapentaplegic homolog 3
- Mothers against decapentaplegic homolog 4
- Mothers against decapentaplegic homolog 5
- Mothers against decapentaplegic homolog 6
- Mothers against decapentaplegic homolog 7
- Mothers against decapentaplegic homolog 9
