= SMAD2 =

Protein found in humans

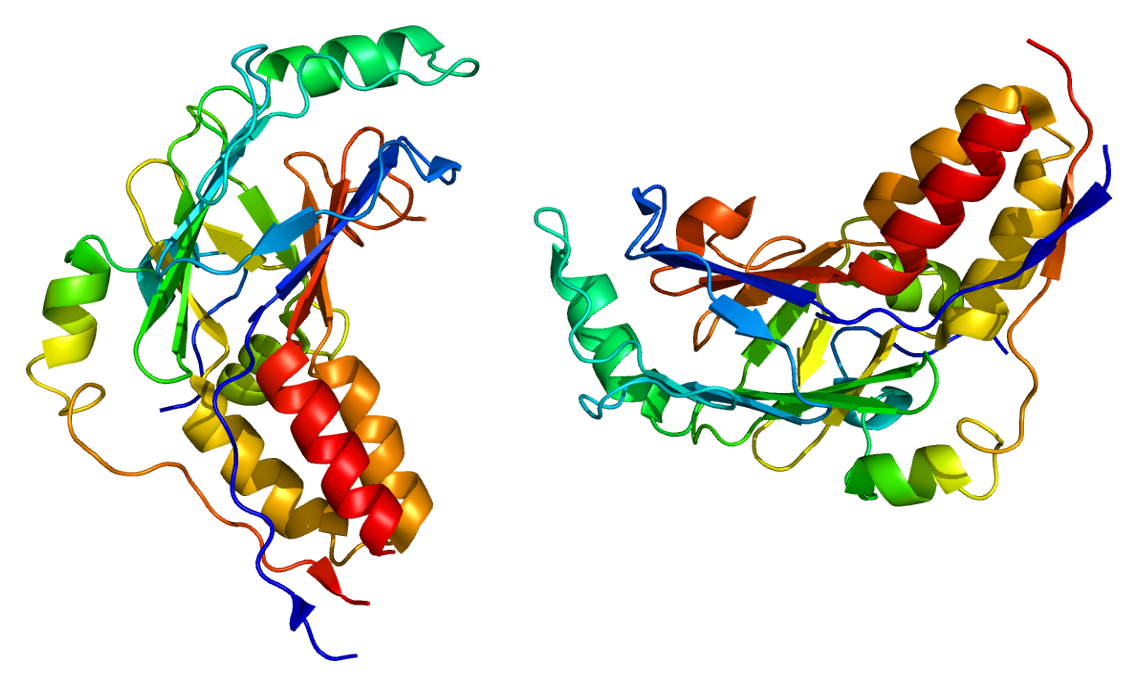

Identifiers
- Aliases: SMAD2, JV18, JV18-1, MADH2, MADR2, hMAD-2, hSMAD family member 2, LDS6, CHTD8
- External IDs: OMIM: 601366; MGI: 108051; GeneCards: SMAD2
Available structures
PDB	Ortholog search: PDBe RCSB
PDB	List of PDB id codes 1DEV, 1KHX, 1U7V, 2LB3

Gene location (Human)
Chr.	Chromosome 18 (human)
Band	18q21.1	Start	47,808,957 bp
Band	18q21.1	End	47,931,146 bp

Gene location (Mouse)
Chr.	Chromosome 18 (mouse)
Band	18 E3|18 51.42 cM	Start	76,374,651 bp
Band	18 E3|18 51.42 cM	End	76,444,034 bp
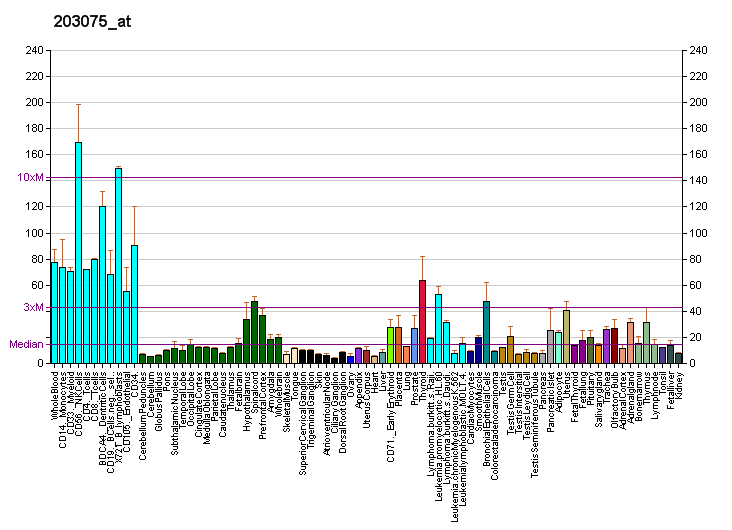

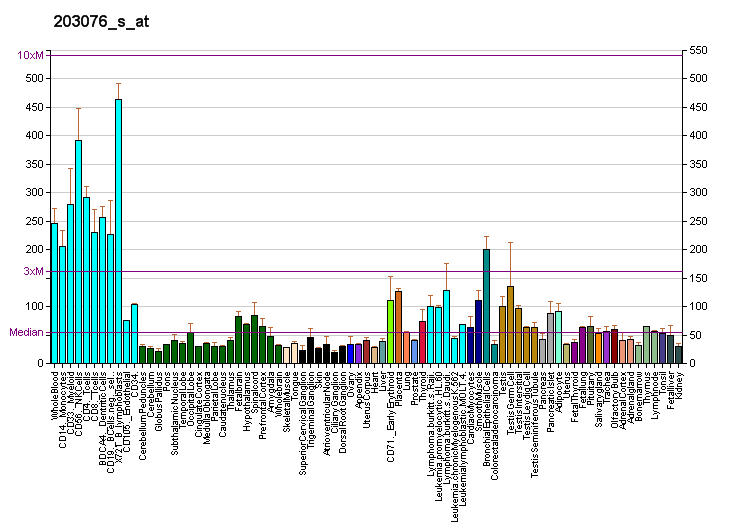

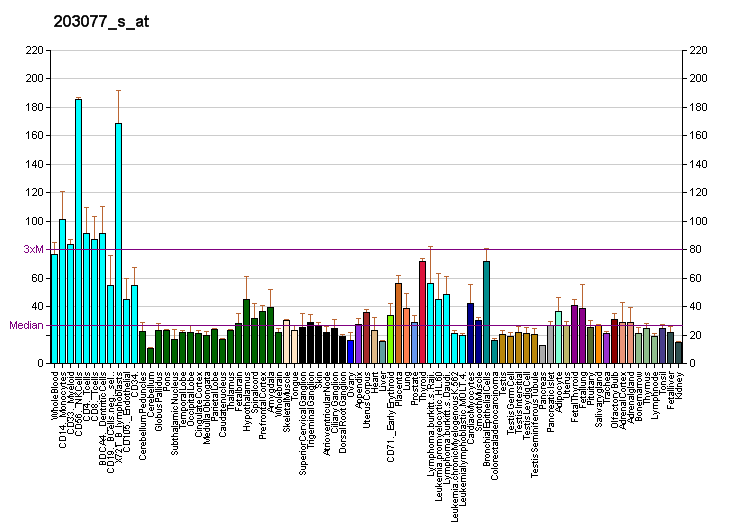
RNA expression pattern
Bgee	Human / Mouse (ortholog); Top expressed in: Achilles tendon; sperm; secondary oocyte; germinal epithelium; monocyte; islet of Langerhans; amniotic fluid; tendon of biceps brachii; hair follicle; epithelium of colon / Top expressed in: saccule; otic placode; zygote; genital tubercle; otic vesicle; tail of embryo; lumbar spinal ganglion; transitional epithelium of urinary bladder; secondary oocyte; primary oocyte; More reference expression data
BioGPS	More reference expression data
Gene ontology
Molecular function	phosphatase binding; I-SMAD binding; DNA-binding transcription factor activity; DNA-binding transcription activator activity, RNA polymerase II-specific; R-SMAD binding; co-SMAD binding; transcription factor binding; metal ion binding; RNA polymerase II cis-regulatory region sequence-specific DNA binding; transforming growth factor beta receptor binding; type I transforming growth factor beta receptor binding; protein homodimerization activity; chromatin binding; protein binding; double-stranded DNA binding; SMAD binding; DNA binding; protein heterodimerization activity; ubiquitin protein ligase binding; primary miRNA binding; disordered domain specific binding; DNA-binding transcription factor activity, RNA polymerase II-specific; tau protein binding
Cellular component	cytoplasm; cytosol; nucleus; heteromeric SMAD protein complex; SMAD protein complex; transcription regulator complex; intracellular anatomical structure; nucleoplasm; activin responsive factor complex; protein-containing complex
Biological process	pattern specification process; ureteric bud development; endoderm development; response to cholesterol; organ growth; embryonic pattern specification; zygotic specification of dorsal/ventral axis; post-embryonic development; protein phosphorylation; pericardium development; regulation of binding; transforming growth factor beta receptor signaling pathway; negative regulation of cell population proliferation; cell fate commitment; common-partner SMAD protein phosphorylation; regulation of transcription, DNA-templated; SMAD protein signal transduction; lung development; signal transduction involved in regulation of gene expression; insulin secretion; in utero embryonic development; negative regulation of transforming growth factor beta receptor signaling pathway; negative regulation of gene expression; nodal signaling pathway; positive regulation of transcription, DNA-templated; development of the heart; pancreas development; endoderm formation; activin receptor signaling pathway; SMAD protein complex assembly; positive regulation of nodal signaling pathway involved in determination of lateral mesoderm left/right asymmetry; embryonic foregut morphogenesis; negative regulation of transcription by RNA polymerase II; response to glucose; positive regulation of epithelial to mesenchymal transition; developmental growth; gastrulation; primary miRNA processing; positive regulation of BMP signaling pathway; embryonic cranial skeleton morphogenesis; negative regulation of transcription, DNA-templated; paraxial mesoderm morphogenesis; intracellular signal transduction; somatic stem cell population maintenance; mesoderm formation; regulation of transforming growth factor beta receptor signaling pathway; positive regulation of gene expression; anterior/posterior pattern specification; positive regulation of transcription by RNA polymerase II; transcription, DNA-templated; transcription by RNA polymerase II; protein deubiquitination; wound healing; adrenal gland development; secondary palate development
Sources:Amigo / QuickGO
Orthologs
Databases	NCBI: entry; OMA: entry
Species	Human	Mouse
Entrez	4087	17126
Ensembl	ENSG00000175387	ENSMUSG00000024563
UniProt	Q15796	Q62432
RefSeq (mRNA)	NM_001003652; NM_001135937; NM_005901	NM_001252481; NM_010754; NM_001311070
RefSeq (protein)	NP_001003652; NP_001129409; NP_005892	NP_001239410; NP_001297999; NP_034884
Location (UCSC)	Chr 18: 47.81 – 47.93 Mb	Chr 18: 76.37 – 76.44 Mb
PubMed search
- Wikidata
View/Edit Human	View/Edit Mouse

Mothers against decapentaplegic homolog 2, also known as SMAD family member 2 or SMAD2, is a protein that in humans is encoded by the SMAD2 gene. MAD homolog 2 belongs to the SMAD, a family of proteins similar to the gene products of the Drosophila gene 'mothers against decapentaplegic' (Mad) and the C. elegans gene Sma. SMAD proteins are signal transducers and transcriptional modulators that mediate multiple signaling pathways.

== Function ==
SMAD2 mediates the signal of the transforming growth factor (TGF)-beta, and thus regulates multiple cellular processes, such as cell proliferation, apoptosis, and differentiation. This protein is recruited to the TGF-beta receptors through its interaction with the SMAD anchor for receptor activation (SARA) protein. In response to TGF-beta signal, this protein is phosphorylated by the TGF-beta receptors. The phosphorylation induces the dissociation of this protein with SARA and the association with the family member SMAD4. The association with SMAD4 is important for the translocation of this protein into the cell nucleus, where it binds to target promoters and forms a transcription repressor complex with other cofactors. This protein can also be phosphorylated by activin type 1 receptor kinase, and mediates the signal from the activin. Alternatively spliced transcript variants encoding the same protein have been observed.

Like other SMADs, SMAD2 plays a role in the transmission of extracellular signals from ligands of the Transforming Growth Factor beta (TGFβ) superfamily of growth factors into the cell nucleus. Binding of a subgroup of TGFβ superfamily ligands to extracellular receptors triggers phosphorylation of SMAD2 at a Serine-Serine-Methionine-Serine (SSMS) motif at its extreme C-terminus. Phosphorylated SMAD2 is then able to form a complex with SMAD4. These complexes accumulate in the cell nucleus, where they are directly participating in the regulation of gene expression.

== Nomenclature ==
The SMAD proteins are homologs of both the drosophila protein, mothers against decapentaplegic (MAD), and the C. elegans protein SMA. The name is a combination of the two. During Drosophila research, it was found that a mutation in the gene MAD in the mother repressed the gene decapentaplegic in the embryo. The phrase "Mothers against" was added, since mothers often form organizations opposing various issues, e.g., Mothers Against Drunk Driving, or (MADD). The nomenclature for this protein is based on a tradition of such unusual naming within the gene research community.

== Interactions ==
Mothers against decapentaplegic homolog 2 has been shown to interact with:

- ANAPC10,
- DAB2,
- EP300,
- FOXH1,
- HDAC1,
- TGIF1,
- Insulin receptor,
- LEF1,
- Myc,
- MEF2A,
- PIAS3,
- PIN1,
- SKI protein,
- SKIL,
- SMAD3,
- SMURF2,
- SNW1,
- STRAP
- WWTR1
