= SMAD4 =

Mammalian protein found in humans

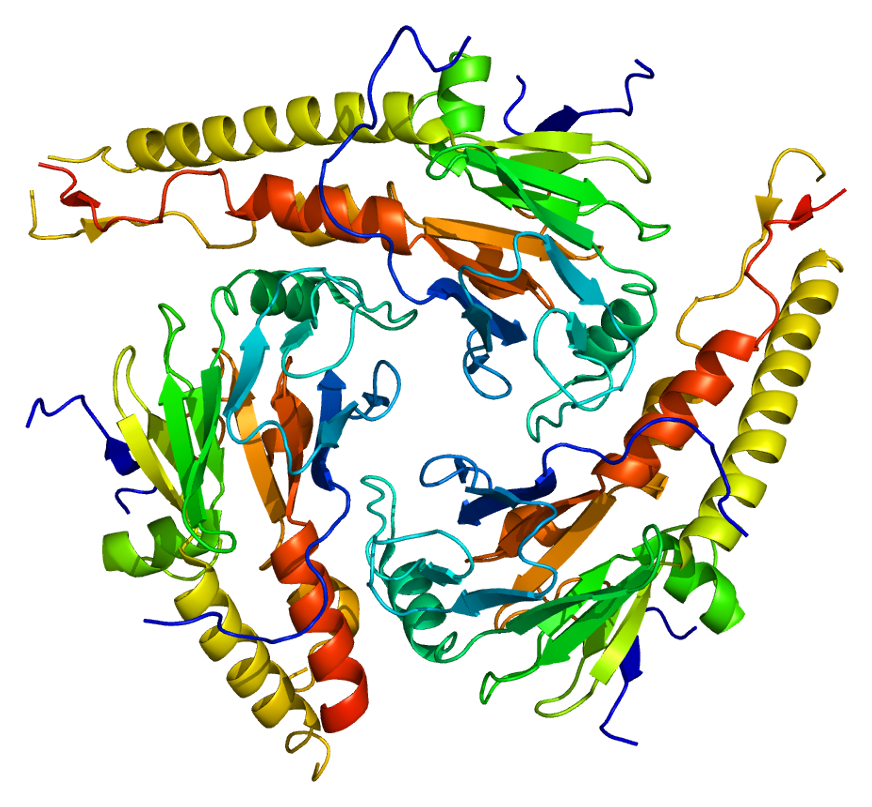

Identifiers
- Aliases: SMAD4, DPC4, JIP, MADH4, MYHRS, SMAD family member 4
- External IDs: OMIM: 600993; MGI: 894293; GeneCards: SMAD4
Available structures
PDB	Ortholog search: PDBe RCSB
PDB	List of PDB id codes 1DD1, 1G88, 1MR1, 1U7F, 1U7V, 1YGS, 5MEY, 5MEZ, 5MF0

Gene location (Human)
Chr.	Chromosome 18 (human)
Band	18q21.2	Start	51,028,394 bp
Band	18q21.2	End	51,085,045 bp

Gene location (Mouse)
Chr.	Chromosome 18 (mouse)
Band	18 E2|18 49.51 cM	Start	73,772,080 bp
Band	18 E2|18 49.51 cM	End	73,836,851 bp
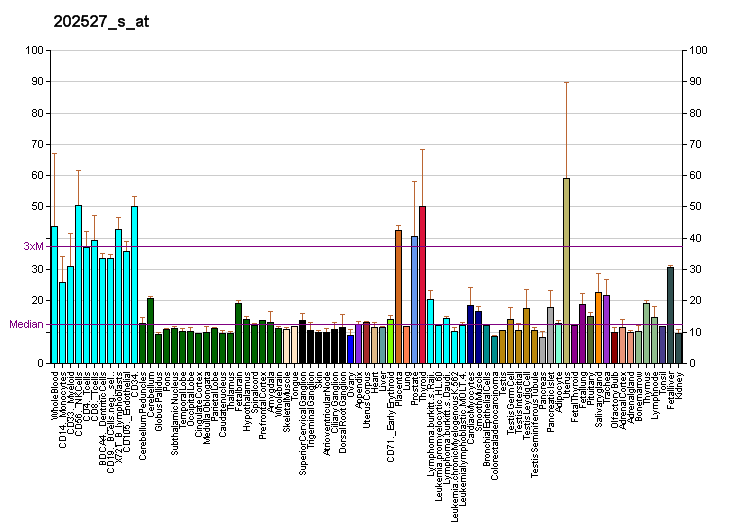

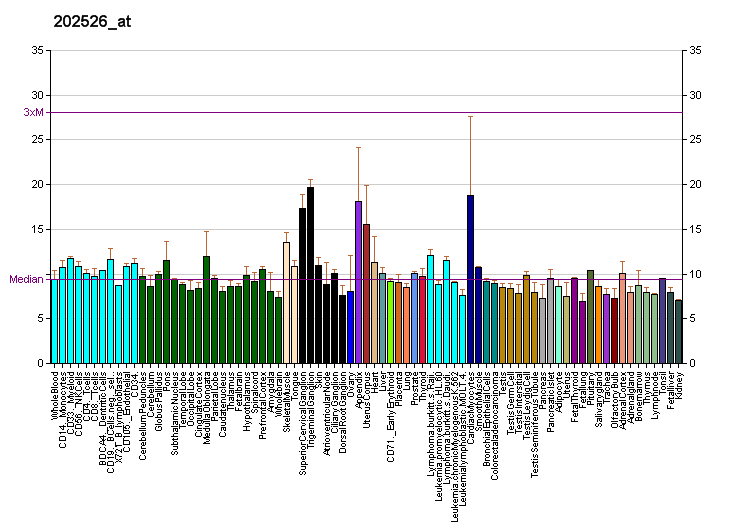
RNA expression pattern
Bgee	Human / Mouse (ortholog); Top expressed in: ventricular zone; ganglionic eminence; Achilles tendon; epithelium of colon; stromal cell of endometrium; left ovary; gallbladder; rectum; popliteal artery; tibial arteries / Top expressed in: Rostral migratory stream; ciliary body; Paneth cell; vas deferens; human fetus; renal corpuscle; medullary collecting duct; conjunctival fornix; medial ganglionic eminence; retinal pigment epithelium; More reference expression data
BioGPS	More reference expression data
Gene ontology
Molecular function	protein homodimerization activity; protein heterodimerization activity; RNA polymerase II transcription regulatory region sequence-specific DNA binding; metal ion binding; DNA binding; DNA-binding transcription factor activity; sequence-specific DNA binding; cis-regulatory region sequence-specific DNA binding; DNA-binding transcription activator activity, RNA polymerase II-specific; I-SMAD binding; collagen binding; protein binding; RNA polymerase II cis-regulatory region sequence-specific DNA binding; R-SMAD binding; identical protein binding; sulfate binding; DNA-binding transcription factor activity, RNA polymerase II-specific; transcription coregulator activity; molecular function regulator; chromatin binding
Cellular component	nucleus; cytoplasm; transcription regulator complex; activin responsive factor complex; intracellular anatomical structure; RNA polymerase II transcription regulator complex; nucleoplasm; centrosome; cytosol; SMAD protein complex
Biological process	negative regulation of cell population proliferation; spermatogenesis; positive regulation of pathway-restricted SMAD protein phosphorylation; positive regulation of luteinizing hormone secretion; regulation of cell population proliferation; cardiac septum development; negative regulation of cell death; regulation of hair follicle development; cellular response to BMP stimulus; epithelial to mesenchymal transition involved in endocardial cushion formation; brainstem development; cell population proliferation; regulation of binding; SMAD protein complex assembly; metanephric mesenchyme morphogenesis; positive regulation of epithelial to mesenchymal transition; positive regulation of transcription from RNA polymerase II promoter involved in cellular response to chemical stimulus; regulation of transcription by RNA polymerase II; branching involved in ureteric bud morphogenesis; regulation of transcription, DNA-templated; embryonic digit morphogenesis; uterus development; axon guidance; somatic stem cell population maintenance; gastrulation; positive regulation of histone H3-K4 methylation; negative regulation of transcription, DNA-templated; response to transforming growth factor beta; endothelial cell activation; positive regulation of transforming growth factor beta receptor signaling pathway; single fertilization; transforming growth factor beta receptor signaling pathway; anterior/posterior pattern specification; in utero embryonic development; positive regulation of cell proliferation involved in heart valve morphogenesis; atrioventricular valve formation; intracellular signal transduction; developmental growth; endoderm development; cellular iron ion homeostasis; kidney development; formation of anatomical boundary; positive regulation of histone H3-K9 acetylation; regulation of transforming growth factor beta2 production; interleukin-6-mediated signaling pathway; negative regulation of transcription by RNA polymerase II; male gonad development; ovarian follicle development; endocardial cell differentiation; nephrogenic mesenchyme morphogenesis; gastrulation with mouth forming second; female gonad development; SMAD protein signal transduction; response to hypoxia; atrioventricular canal development; mesoderm development; negative regulation of cell growth; positive regulation of transcription, DNA-templated; BMP signaling pathway; tissue morphogenesis; positive regulation of transcription by RNA polymerase II; positive regulation of SMAD protein signal transduction; somite rostral/caudal axis specification; sebaceous gland development; positive regulation of follicle-stimulating hormone secretion; positive regulation of BMP signaling pathway; neural crest cell differentiation; seminiferous tubule development; female gonad morphogenesis; regulation of transforming growth factor beta receptor signaling pathway; neuron fate commitment; transcription, DNA-templated; outflow tract septum morphogenesis; left ventricular cardiac muscle tissue morphogenesis; negative regulation of cardiac muscle hypertrophy; protein deubiquitination; ventricular septum morphogenesis; negative regulation of ERK1 and ERK2 cascade; negative regulation of cardiac myofibril assembly; protein homotrimerization; pri-miRNA transcription by RNA polymerase II; secondary palate development; anatomical structure morphogenesis; cell differentiation; mesendoderm development
Sources:Amigo / QuickGO
Orthologs
Databases	NCBI: entry; OMA: entry
Species	Human	Mouse
Entrez	4089	17128
Ensembl	ENSG00000141646	ENSMUSG00000024515
UniProt	Q13485	P97471
RefSeq (mRNA)	NM_005359	NM_008540; NM_001364967; NM_001364968
RefSeq (protein)	NP_005350	NP_032566; NP_001351896; NP_001351897
Location (UCSC)	Chr 18: 51.03 – 51.09 Mb	Chr 18: 73.77 – 73.84 Mb
PubMed search
- Wikidata
View/Edit Human	View/Edit Mouse

SMAD4, also called SMAD family member 4, Mothers against decapentaplegic homolog 4, or DPC4 (deleted in pancreatic cancer 4) is a highly conserved protein present in all metazoans. It belongs to the SMAD family of transcription factor proteins, which act as mediators of TGF-β signal transduction. The TGFβ family of cytokines regulates critical processes during the lifecycle of metazoans, with important roles during embryo development, tissue homeostasis, regeneration, and immune regulation.

SMAD 4 belongs to the co-SMAD group (common mediator SMAD), the second class of the SMAD family. SMAD4 is the only known co-SMAD in most metazoans. It also belongs to the Dwarfin family of proteins that modulate members of the TGFβ protein superfamily, a family of proteins that all play a role in the regulation of cellular responses. Mammalian SMAD4 is a homolog of the Drosophila protein "Mothers against decapentaplegic" named Medea.

SMAD4 interacts with R-Smads, such as SMAD2, SMAD3, SMAD1, SMAD5 and SMAD9 (also called SMAD8) to form heterotrimeric complexes. Transcriptional coregulators, such as WWTR1 (TAZ) interact with SMADs to promote their function. Once in the nucleus, the complex of SMAD4 and two R-SMADS binds to DNA and regulates the expression of different genes depending on the cellular context. Intracellular reactions involving SMAD4 are triggered by the binding, on the surface of the cells, of growth factors from the TGFβ family. The sequence of intracellular reactions involving SMADS is called the SMAD pathway or the transforming growth factor beta (TGF-β) pathway since the sequence starts with the recognition of TGF-β by cells.

== Gene ==
In humans, the SMAD4 gene contains 54 829 base pairs and is located from pair n° 51,030,212 to pair 51,085,041 in the region 21.1 of the chromosome 18.

Pattern of the chromosome 18 in Homo sapiens. The SMAD 4 gene is located on the long arm of the chromosome, at locus 21.1. This locus corresponds to the black stripe between the regions 12.3 and 21.2.

== Protein ==
SMAD4 is a 552 amino-acid polypeptide with a molecular mass of 60.439 kDa. SMAD4 has two functional domains known as MH1 and MH2.

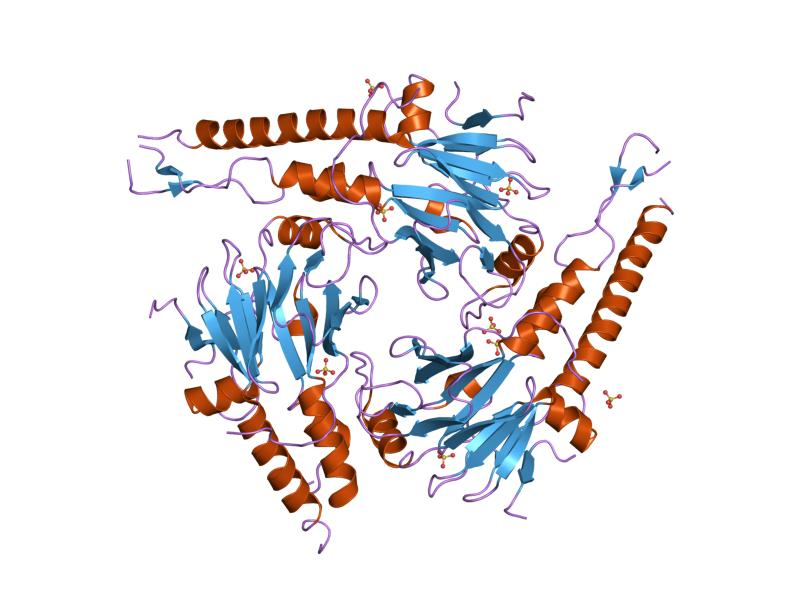
SMAD 4 is composed of three major domains, including MH1 (up), MH2 (down) and a linking domain (right).

The complex of two SMAD3 (or of two SMAD2) and one SMAD4 binds directly to DNA though interactions of their MH1 domains. These complexes are recruited to sites throughout the genome by cell lineage-defining transcription factors (LDTFs) that determine the context-dependent nature of TGF-β action. Early insights into the DNA binding specificity of Smad proteins came from oligonucleotide binding screens, which identified the palindromic duplex 5'–GTCTAGAC–3' as a high affinity binding sequence for SMAD3 and SMAD4 MH1 domains. Other motifs have also been identified in promoters and enhancers. These additional sites contain the CAGCC motif and the GGC(GC)|(CG) consensus sequences, the latter also known as 5GC sites. The 5GC-motifs are highly represented as clusters of sites, in SMAD-bound regions genome-wide. These clusters can also contain CAG(AC)|(CC) sites. SMAD3/SMAD4 complex also binds to the TPA-responsive gene promoter elements, which have the sequence motif TGAGTCAG.

== Structures ==
=== MH1 domain complexes with DNA motifs ===
The first structure of SMAD4 bound to DNA was the complex with the palindromic GTCTAGAC motif. Recently, the structures of SMAD4 MH1 domain bound to several 5GC motifs have also been determined. In all complexes, the interaction with the DNA involves a conserved β-hairpin present in the MH1 domain. The hairpin is partially flexible in solution and its high degree of conformational flexibility allows recognition of the different 5-bp sequences. Efficient interactions with GC-sites occur only if a G nucleotide is located deep in the major grove, and establishes hydrogen bonds with the guanidinium group of Arg81. This interaction facilitates a complementary surface contact between the Smad DNA-binding hairpin and the major groove of the DNA. Other direct interactions involve Lys88 and Gln83. The X-ray crystal structure of the Trichoplax adhaerens SMAD4 MH1 domains bound to the GGCGC motif indicates a high conservation of this interaction in metazoans.

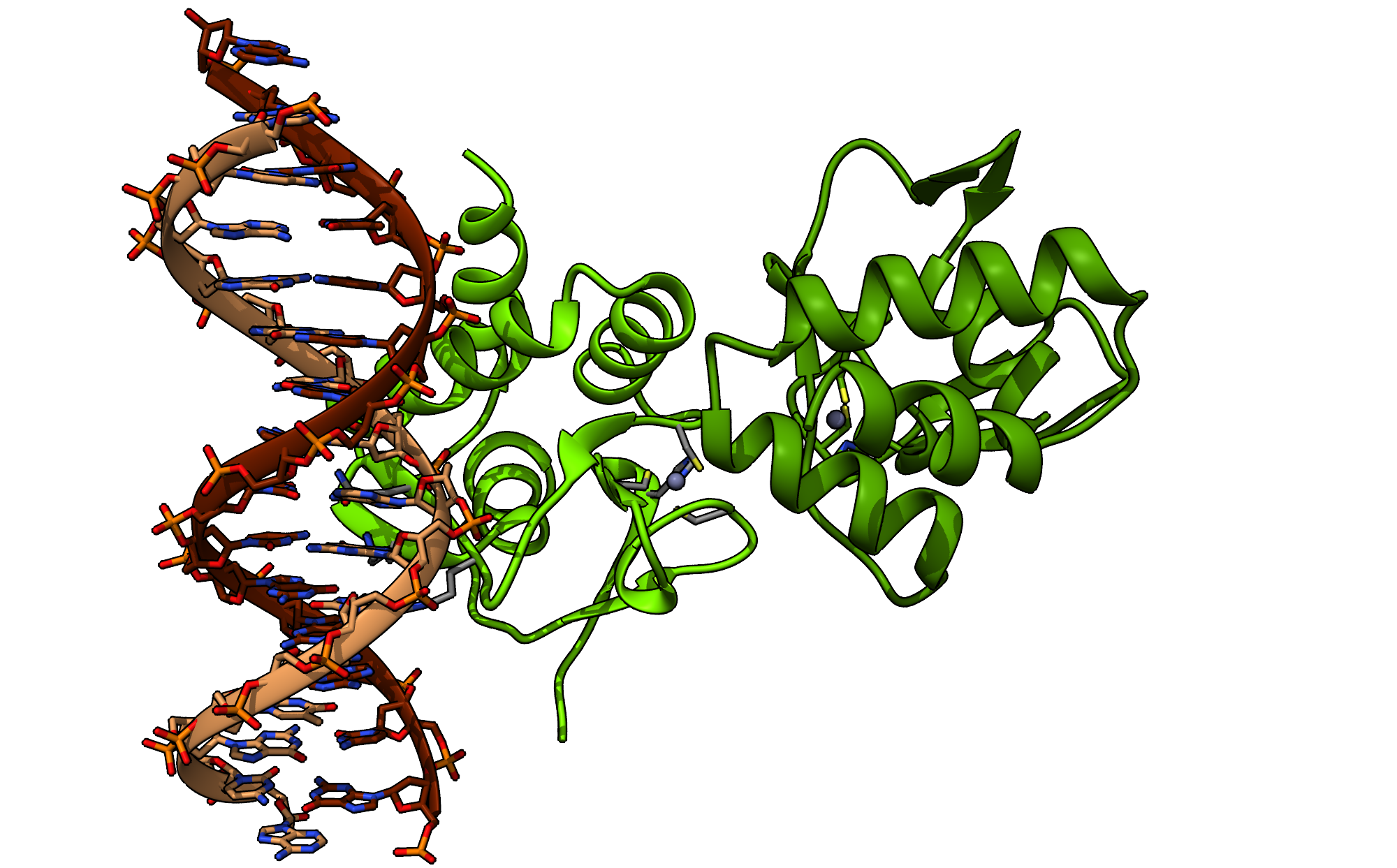
Smad4 MH1 domain bound to the GGCT DNA motif, from PDB: 5MEZ

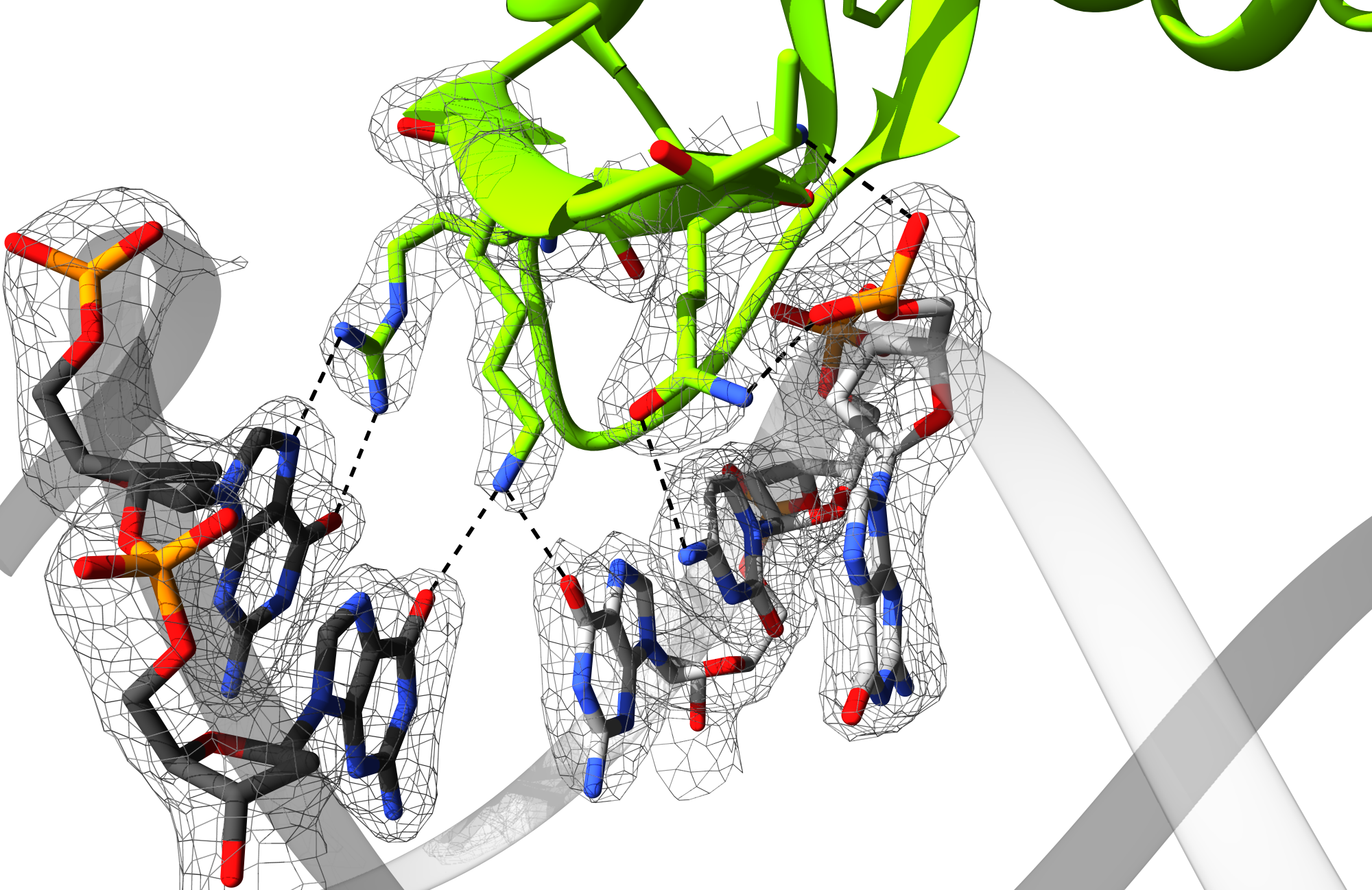
Close-up view of the Smad4 MH1 domain bound to the GGCGC DNA motif, from PDB: 5MEY

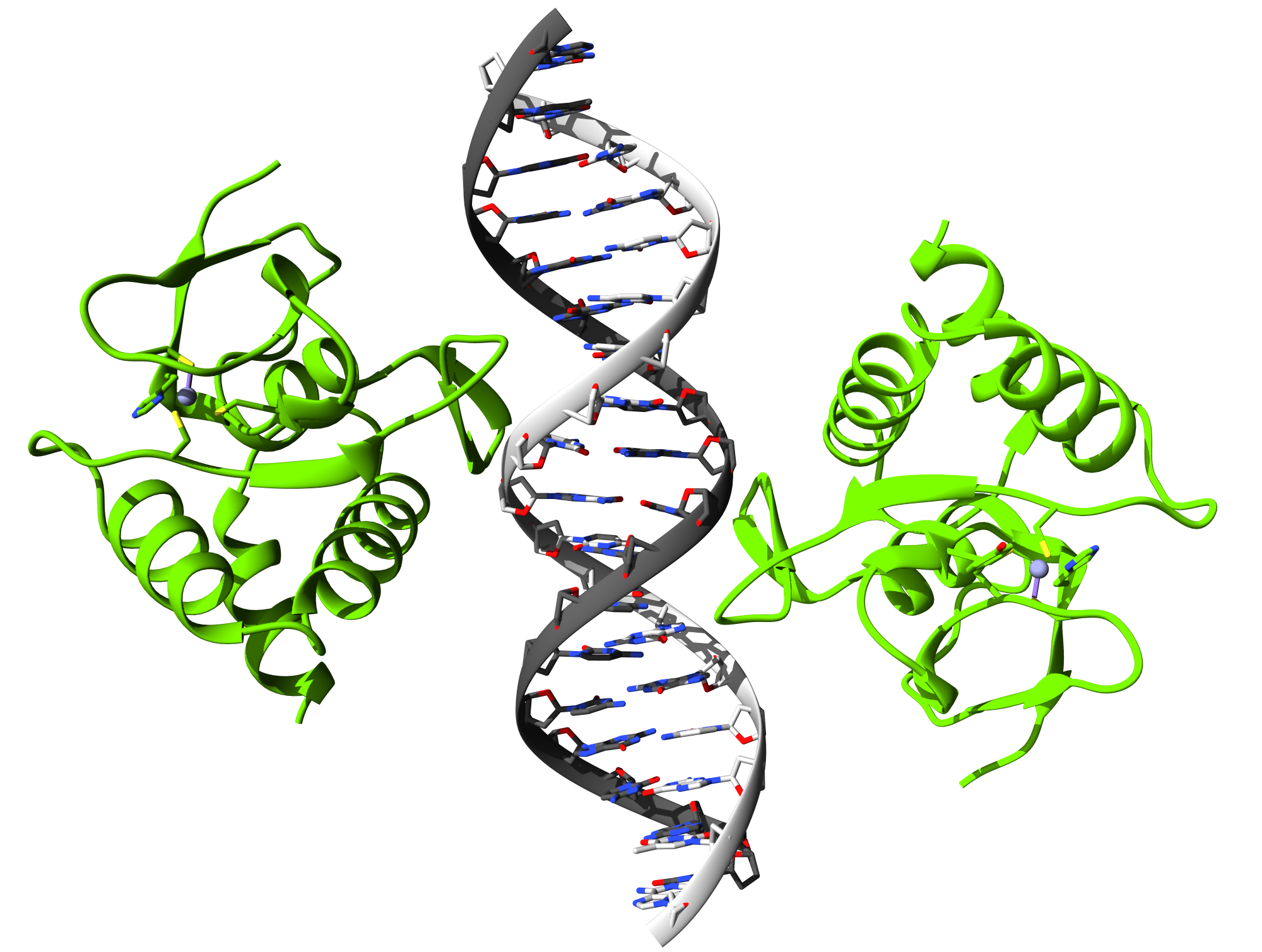
Smad4 MH1 domain bound to the GGCGC DNA motif, from PDB: 5MEY

=== MH2 domain complexes ===
The MH2 domain, corresponding to the C-terminus, is responsible for receptor recognition and association with other SMADs. It interacts with the R-SMADS MH2 domain and forms heterodimers and heterotrimers. Some tumor mutations detected in SMAD4 enhance interactions between the MH1 and MH2 domains.

== Nomenclature and origin of name ==
SMADs are highly conserved across species, especially in the N terminal MH1 domain and the C terminal MH2 domain. The SMAD proteins are homologs of both the Drosophila protein MAD and the C. elegans protein SMA. The name is a combination of the two. During Drosophila research, it was found that a mutation in the gene MAD in the mother repressed the gene decapentaplegic in the embryo. The phrase "Mothers against" was added, since mothers often form organizations opposing various issues, e.g. Mothers Against Drunk Driving (MADD), reflecting "the maternal-effect enhancement of dpp"; and based on a tradition of unusual naming within the research community. SMAD4 is also known as DPC4, JIP or MADH4.

== Function and action mechanism ==
SMAD4 is a protein defined as an essential effector in the SMAD pathway. SMAD4 serves as a mediator between extracellular growth factors from the TGFβ family and genes inside the cell nucleus. The abbreviation co in co-SMAD stands for common mediator. SMAD4 is also defined as a signal transducer.

In the TGF-β pathway, TGF-β dimers are recognized by a transmembrane receptor, known as type II receptor. Once the type II receptor is activated by the binding of TGF-β, it phosphorylates a type I receptor. Type I receptor is also a cell surface receptor. This receptor then phosphorylates intracellular receptor regulated SMADS (R-SMADS) such as SMAD2 or SMAD3. The phosphorylated R-SMADS then bind to SMAD4. The R-SMADs-SMAD4 association is a heteromeric complex. This complex is going to move from the cytoplasm to the nucleus: it is the translocation. SMAD4 may form heterotrimeric, heterohexameric or heterodimeric complexes with R-SMADS.

SMAD4 is a substrate of the Erk/MAPK kinase and GSK3. The FGF (Fibroblast Growth Factor) pathway stimulation leads to Smad4 phosphorylation by Erk of the canonical MAPK site located at Threonine 277. This phosphorylation event has a dual effect on Smad4 activity. First, it allows Smad4 to reach its peak of transcriptional activity by activating a growth factor–regulated transcription activation domain located in the Smad4 linker region, SAD (Smad-Activation Domain). Second, MAPK primes Smad4 for GSK3-mediated phosphorylations that cause transcriptional inhibition and also generate a phosphodegron used as a docking site by the ubiquitin E3 ligase Beta-transducin Repeat Containing (beta-TrCP) that polyubiquitinates Smad4 and targets it for degradation in the proteasome. Smad4 GSK3 phosphorylations have been proposed to regulate the protein stability during pancreatic and colon cancer progression.

In the nucleus the heteromeric complex binds promoters and interact with transcriptional activators. SMAD3/SMAD4 complexes can directly bind the SBE. These associations are weak and require additional transcription factors such as members of the AP-1 family, TFE3 and FoxG1 to regulate gene expression.

Many TGFβ ligands use this pathway and subsequently SMAD4 is involved in many cell functions such as differentiation, apoptosis, gastrulation, embryonic development and the cell cycle.

== Clinical significance ==
Genetic experiments such as gene knockout (KO), which consist in modifying or inactivating a gene, can be carried out in order to see the effects of a dysfunctional SMAD 4 on the study organism. Experiments are often conducted in the house mouse (Mus musculus).

It has been shown that, in mouse KO of SMAD4, the granulosa cells, which secrete hormones and growth factors during the oocyte development, undergo premature luteinization and express lower levels of follicle-stimulating hormone receptors (FSHR) and higher levels of luteinizing hormone receptors (LHR). This may be due in part to impairment of bone morphogenetic protein-7 effects as BMP-7 uses the SMAD4 signaling pathway.

Deletions in the genes coding for SMAD1 and SMAD5 have also been linked to metastasic granulosa cell tumors in mice.

SMAD4, is often found mutated in many cancers. The mutation can be inherited or acquired during an individual's lifetime. If inherited, the mutation affects both somatic cells and cells of the reproductive organs. If the SMAD 4 mutation is acquired, it will only exist in certain somatic cells. Indeed, SMAD 4 is not synthesized by all cells. The protein is present in skin, pancreatic, colon, uterus and epithelial cells. It is also produced by fibroblasts. The functional SMAD 4 participates in the regulation of the TGF-β signal transduction pathway, which negatively regulates growth of epithelial cells and the extracellular matrix (ECM). When the structure of SMAD 4 is altered, expression of the genes involved in cell growth is no longer regulated and cell proliferation can go on without any inhibition. The important number of cell divisions leads to the forming of tumors and then to multiploid colorectal cancer and pancreatic carcinoma. It is found inactivated in at least 50% of pancreatic cancers.

Somatic mutations found in human cancers of the MH1 domain of SMAD 4 have been shown to inhibit the DNA-binding function of this domain.

SMAD 4 is also found mutated in the autosomal dominant disease juvenile polyposis syndrome (JPS). JPS is characterized by hamartomatous polyps in the gastrointestinal (GI) tract. These polyps are usually benign, however they are at greater risk of developing gastrointestinal cancers, in particular colon cancer. Around 60 mutations causing JPS have been identified. They have been linked to the production of a smaller SMAD 4, with missing domains that prevent the protein from binding to R-SMADS and forming heteromeric complexes.

Mutations in SMAD4 (mostly substitutions) can cause Myhre syndrome, a rare inherited disorder characterized by mental disabilities, short stature, unusual facial features, and various bone abnormalities.
