= Decapentaplegic =

Key morphogen in fruit fly development

Identifiers
- Organism: Drosophila melanogaster
- Symbol: Dpp
- Orthologs: OMA: entry
- UniProt: P07713
Search for
- Structures: Swiss-model
- Domains: InterPro

Decapentaplegic (Dpp) is a key morphogen involved in the development of the fruit fly Drosophila melanogaster and is the first validated secreted morphogen. It is known to be necessary for the correct patterning and development of the early Drosophila embryo and the fifteen imaginal discs, which are tissues that will become limbs and other organs and structures in the adult fly. It has also been suggested that Dpp plays a role in regulating the growth and size of tissues. Flies with mutations in decapentaplegic fail to form these structures correctly, hence the name (decapenta-, fifteen; -plegic, paralysis). Dpp is the Drosophila homolog of the vertebrate bone morphogenetic proteins (BMPs), which are members of the TGF-β superfamily, a class of proteins that are often associated with their own specific signaling pathway. Studies of Dpp in Drosophila have led to greater understanding of the function and importance of their homologs in vertebrates like humans.

== Function in Drosophila ==
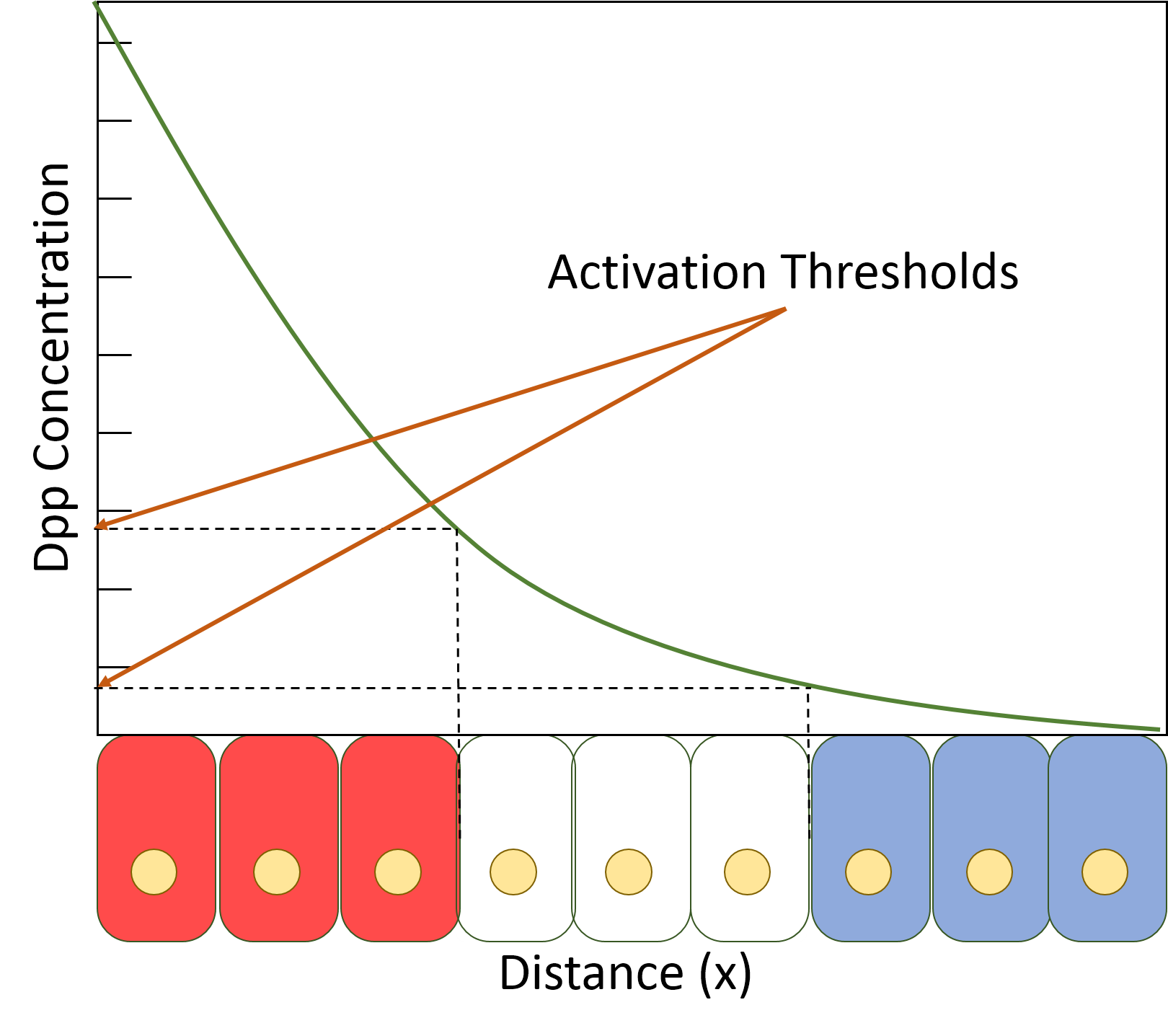
Morphogen concentration as a function of distance from the source (commonly referred to as the "French flag model"). The concentration of Dpp within certain boundaries and above certain thresholds lead to different cell fates. The exponential decay of the gradient allows the thresholds to not be affected by differences in tissue length. For example, with one set of parameters, an 80% drop in concentration will always occur 1/3 of the length of the tissue away, regardless of tissue size.

Dpp is a classic morphogen, which means that it is present in a spatial concentration gradient in the tissues where it is found, and its presence as a gradient gives it functional meaning in how it affects development. The most studied tissues in which Dpp is found are the early embryo and the imaginal wing discs, which later form the wings of the fly. During embryonic development, Dpp is uniformly expressed at the dorsal side of the embryo, establishing a sharp concentration gradient. In the imaginal discs, Dpp is strongly expressed in a narrow stripe of cells down the middle of the disc where the tissue marks the border between the anterior and posterior sides. Dpp diffuses from this stripe towards the edges of the tissue, forming a gradient as expected of a morphogen. However, although cells in the Dpp domain in the embryo do not proliferate, cells in the imaginal wing disc proliferate heavily, causing tissue growth. Although gradient formation in the early embryo is well understood, how the Dpp morphogen gradient forms in the wing imaginal disc remains controversial.

=== Role and formation in embryonic development ===
At the early blastoderm stage, Dpp signaling is uniform and low along the dorsal side. A sharp signaling profile emerges at the dorsal midline of the embryo during cellularization, with high levels of Dpp specifying the extraembryonic amnioserosa and low levels specifying the dorsal ectoderm. Dpp signaling also incorporates a positive feedback mechanism that promotes future Dpp binding. The morphogen gradient in embryos is established via a known active transport mechanism. Gradient formation depends on the BMP inhibitors Short gastrulation (Sog) and Twisted gastrulation (Tsg), and other extracellular proteins such as Tolloid (Tld), and Screw (Scw). Sog is produced in the ventral-lateral region of the embryo (perpendicular to the Dpp gradient) and forms a BMP-inhibiting gradient that prevents Dpp from binding to its receptor. Sog and Tsg form a complex with Dpp and are actively transported toward the dorsal midline (middle of the embryo), following the Sog concentration gradient. Tld, a metalloprotease, releases Dpp from the complex by mediating Sog processing, activating Dpp signaling at the midline. After gastrulation of the embryo, the Dpp gradient induces cardiac and visceral mesoderm formation.

=== Signaling pathway ===
Dpp, like its vertebrate homologs, is a signaling molecule. In Drosophila, the receptor for Dpp is formed by two proteins, Thickveins (Tkv) and Punt. Like Dpp itself, Tkv and Punt are highly similar to homologs in other species. When a cell receives a Dpp signal, the receptors are able to activate an intracellular protein called mothers against Dpp (MAD) by phosphorylation. The initial discovery of MAD in Drosophila paved the way for later experiments that identified the responder to TGF-β signaling in vertebrates, called SMADs. Activated MAD is able to bind to DNA and act as a transcription factor to affect the expression of different genes in response to Dpp signaling. Genes activated by Dpp signaling include optomotor blind (omb) and spalt, and activity of these genes are often used as indicators of Dpp signaling in experiments. Another gene with a more complicated regulatory interaction with Dpp is brinker. Brinker is a transcription factor that represses the activation targets of Dpp, so in order to turn on these genes Dpp must repress brinker as well as activate the other targets.

=== Role in imaginal wing disc ===
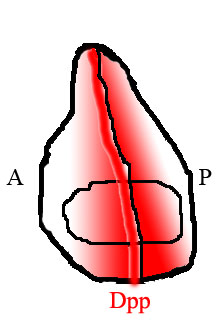
A picture illustrating the distribution of Dpp, shown in red, in the wing disc. Dpp is produced in a stripe just anterior of the anterior/posterior border and diffuses out to the edges of the tissue.

In the fly wing, the posterior and anterior halves of the tissue are populated by different kinds of cells that express different genes. Cells in the posterior but not the anterior express the transcription factor engrailed (En). One of the genes activated by En is hedgehog (hh), a signaling factor. Hedgehog signaling instructs neighboring cells to express Dpp, but Dpp expression is also repressed by En. The result is that Dpp is only produced in a narrow stripe of cells immediately adjacent to but not within the posterior half of the tissue. Dpp produced at this anterior/posterior border then diffuses out to the edges of the tissue, forming a spatial concentration gradient.

By reading their position along the gradient of Dpp, cells in the wing are able to determine their location relative to the anterior/posterior border, and they behave and develop accordingly.

It is possible that it is not actually the diffusion and gradient of Dpp that patterns tissues, but instead cells that receive Dpp signal instruct their neighbors on what to be, and those cells in turn signal their neighbors in a cascade through the tissue. Several experiments have been done to disprove this hypothesis and establish that it is actually the gradient of actual Dpp molecules that are responsible for patterning.

Mutant forms of the Dpp receptor Tkv exist that behave as if they are receiving high amounts of Dpp signal even in the absence of Dpp. Cells that contain this mutant receptor behave as if they are in an environment of high Dpp such as the area near the stripe of cells producing Dpp. By generating small patches of these cells in different parts of the wing tissue, investigators were able to distinguish how Dpp acts to pattern the tissue. If cells that receive a Dpp signal instruct their neighbors in a cascade, then additional tissue patterning centers should appear at the sites of the mutant cells that seem to receive high Dpp signaling but do not produce any Dpp themselves. However, if the physical presence of Dpp is necessary, then the cells near the mutants should not be affected at all. Experiments found the second case to be true, indicating that Dpp acts like a morphogen.

The common way to assess differences in tissue patterning in the fly wing is to look at the pattern of veins in the wing. In flies where the ability of Dpp to diffuse through the tissue is impaired, the positioning of the veins is shifted from that in normal flies, and the wing is generally smaller.

Dpp has also been proposed as a regulator of tissue growth and size, a classic problem in development. A problem common to organisms with multicellular organs that must grow from an initial size is how to know when to stop growing after the appropriate size is reached. Since Dpp is present in a gradient, it is conceivable that the slope of the gradient could be the measurement by which a tissue determines how large it is. If the amount of Dpp at the source is fixed and the amount at the edge of the tissue is zero, then the steepness of the gradient will decrease as the size of the tissue and the distance between the source and the edge increase. Experiments where an artificially steep gradient of Dpp is induced in wing tissue resulted in significantly increased amounts of cell proliferation, lending support to the steepness hypothesis.

=== Formation of the Dpp gradient in the imaginal wing disc ===
The shape of the Dpp gradient is determined by four ligand kinetic parameters that are affected by biological parameters:

1. The effective diffusion coefficient, which is dependent on extracellular diffusion, intracellular transport rates, and receptor binding/unbinding kinetics.
2. The effective extracellular and intracellular degradation rates.
3. The production rate, dependent on the Dpp production pathway.
4. The immobile fraction (a parameter associated with the method used to measure Dpp kinetics, FRAP).

A single biological parameter can affect multiple kinetic parameters. For example, receptor levels will affect both the diffusion coefficient and the degradation rates.

However, the mechanism by which the Dpp gradient is formed is still controversial, and no complete explanation has been proposed or proven. The four main categories of theories behind the formation of the gradient are free diffusion, restricted diffusion, transcytosis, and cytoneme-assisted transport.

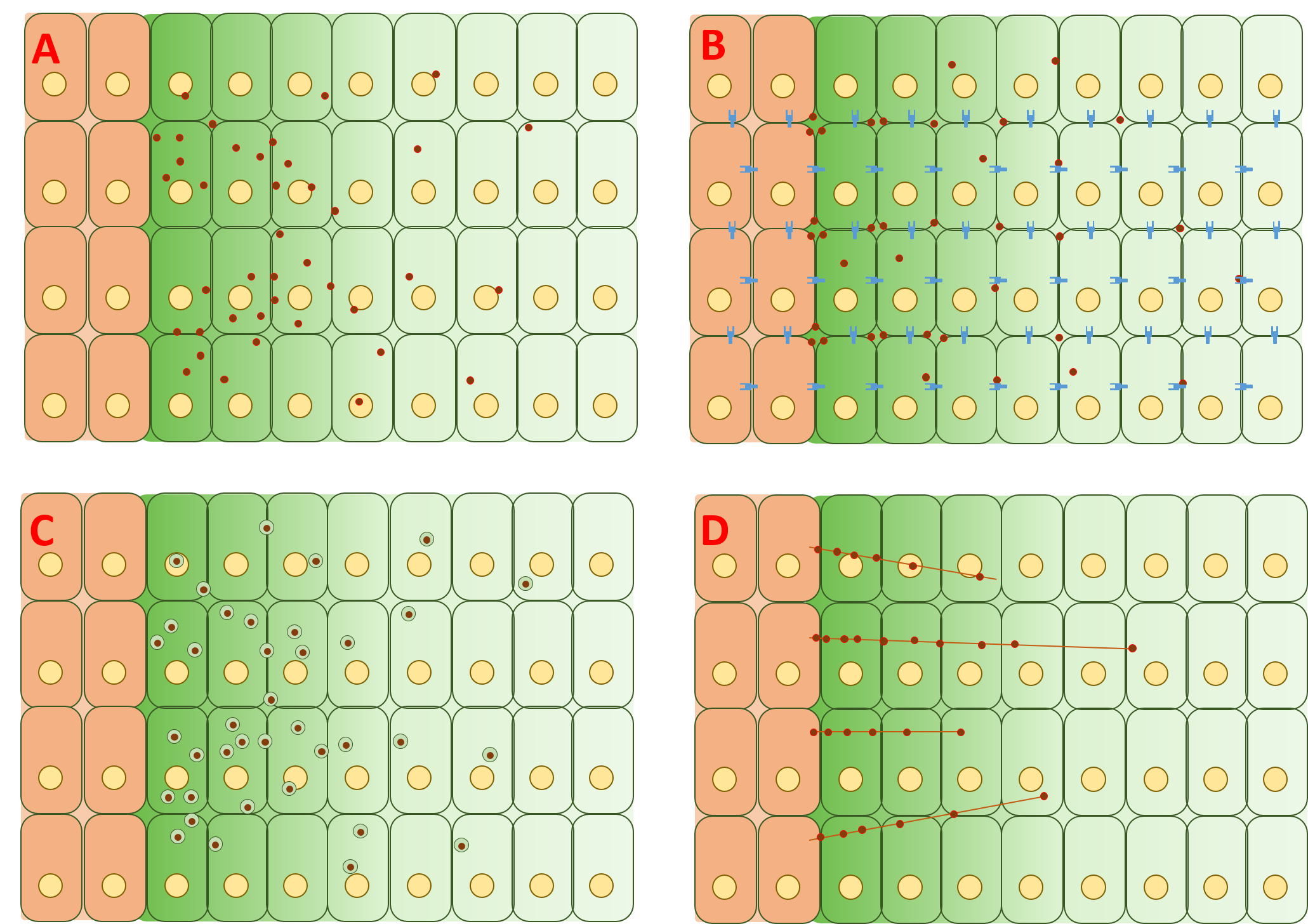
An illustration of the assumptions made by each Dpp gradient formation model. A) Free diffusion model: Dpp freely diffuses through the ECM. B) Restricted diffusion model: Dpp diffuses through the ECM and interacts with proteoglycans and receptors. C) Transcytosis model: Dpp passes through cells via endocytosis. D) Cytoneme-mediated transport model: Dpp is directly routed to target cells via actin-based cytonemes.

==== Free/restricted diffusion model ====
The free diffusion model assumes Dpp to diffuse freely through the extracellular matrix, degrading via receptor-mediated degradation events. FRAP assays have argued against this model by noting that diffusion of GFP-Dpp does not match that expected of a similarly sized molecule. However, others have argued that a rate-limiting slow step further downstream of the process such as slow immobilization and slow degradation of Dpp itself could account for the observed differences in diffusion. Single molecules of Dpp have been tracked using fluorescence correlation spectroscopy (FCS), showing that 65% of Dpp molecules diffuse rapidly (consistent with the free diffusion model) and 35% diffuse slowly (consistent with Dpp bound to receptors or glypicans).

The restricted diffusion model includes the effects of cell packing geometry and interactions with the extracellular matrix via binding events with receptors such as Tkv and the heparin sulfate proteoglycans dally and dally-like.

==== Transcytosis model ====
The transcytosis model assumes Dpp to be transported via repeated rounds of intracellular receptor-mediated endocytosis, with the gradient severity determined by endocytotic sorting of Dpp toward recycling through cells vs degradation. This model was initially based on an initial observation that Dpp could not accumulate across clones where a critical protein called dynamin necessary for endocytosis had been mutated into the shibire (shi) phenotype. However, other experiments showed that Dpp was able to accumulate over shi clones, challenging the transcytosis model. A revision of the theory behind the model proposes that endocytosis is not essential for Dpp movement but is involved in Dpp signaling. Dpp fails to move across cells with mutated dally and dally-like, two heparin sulfate proteoglycans (HSPGs) commonly found in the extracellular matrix. As a result, these results suggest that Dpp moves along the cell surface via restricted extracellular diffusion involving dally and dally-like, but the transport of Dpp itself does not rely on transcytosis.

==== Cytoneme-mediated transport model ====
The cytoneme-mediated model suggests that Dpp is directly transported to target cells via actin-based filopodia called cytonemes that extend from the apical surface of Dpp-responding cells to the Dpp-producing source cells. These cytonemes have been observed, but the dependence of the Dpp gradient on cytonemes has not been definitively proven in imaginal wing discs. However, Dpp is known to be required for and sufficient to extend and maintain cytonemes. Experiments analyzing the dynamics between Dpp and cytonemes have been conducted in the air sac primordium, where Dpp signaling was found to have a functional link with cytonemes. However, these experiments have not been replicated in imaginal wing discs.

== Role in molluscs ==
Dpp is also found in molluscs, where it plays a key role in shell formation by controlling the shape of the conch. In bivalves, it is expressed until the protoconch has taken on the required shape, after which point its expression ceases. It is also associated with shell formation in gastropods, with an asymmetric distribution that may be associated with their coiling: shell growth appears to be inhibited where Dpp is expressed.
