= Activin receptor =

Activin types I and II receptor domain

Identifiers
- Symbol: Activin_recp
- Pfam: PF01064
- InterPro: IPR000472
- PROSITE: PDOC00223
- SCOP2: 1tbi / SCOPe / SUPFAM
- Membranome: 1216
Available protein structures:
- Pfam: structures / ECOD
- PDB: RCSB PDB; PDBe; PDBj
- PDBsum: structure summary

An Activin receptor is a receptor which binds activin. These proteins are receptor-type kinases of Ser/Thr type, which have a single transmembrane domain and a specific hydrophilic Cys-rich ligand-binding domain.

Types include:

- Activin type 1 receptors
- Activin type 2 receptors

== Human proteins containing this domain ==
ACVR1; ACVR1B; ACVR1C; ACVR2A; ACVR2B; ACVRL1; BMPR1A; BMPR1B; BMPR2; TGFBR1;
