= TGF-beta receptor family =

Family of proteins involved in a TGF signaling pathway

Ser/Thr protein kinase, TGFB receptor

Identifiers
- Symbol: TGFb_receptor
- InterPro: IPR000333
- SCOP2: 1B6C / SCOPe / SUPFAM
- Membranome: 1216
Available protein structures:
- PDB: IPR000333
- AlphaFold: IPR000333

The transforming growth factor beta (TGFβ) receptors are a family of serine/threonine kinase receptors involved in TGF beta signaling pathway. These receptors bind growth factor and cytokine signaling proteins in the TGF-beta family such as TGFβs (TGFβ1, TGFβ2, TGFβ3), bone morphogenetic proteins (BMPs), growth differentiation factors (GDFs), activin and inhibin, myostatin, anti-Müllerian hormone (AMH), and NODAL.

== TGFβ family receptors ==
TGFβ family receptors are grouped into three types, type I, type II, and type III. There are seven type I receptors, termed the activin-like receptors (ALK1–7), five type II receptors, and one type III receptor, for a total of 13 TGFβ superfamily receptors. In the transduction pathway, ligand-bound type II receptors activate type I receptors by phosphorylation, which then autophosphorylate and bind SMAD. The Type I receptors have a glycine-serine (GS, or TTSGSGSG) repeat motif of around 30 AA, a target of type II activity. At least three, and perhaps four to five of the serines and threonines in the GS domain, must be phosphorylated to fully activate TbetaR-1.

=== Type I ===
Transforming growth factor beta type I GS-motif

Identifiers
- Symbol: TGF_beta_GS
- Pfam: PF08515
- InterPro: IPR003605
Available protein structures:
- PDB: IPR003605 PF08515 (ECOD; PDBsum)
- AlphaFold: IPR003605; PF08515

- ALK1 (ACVRL1)
- ALK2 (ACVR1A)
- ALK3 (BMPR1A)
- ALK4 (ACVR1B)
- ALK5 (TGFβR1)
- ALK6 (BMPR1B)
- ALK7 (ACVR1C)

=== Type II ===
- TGFβR2
- BMPR2
- ACVR2A
- ACVR2B
- AMHR2 (AMHR)

=== Type III ===
Unlike the Type I and II receptors which are kinases, TGFBR3 has a Zona pellucida-like domain. Its core domain binds TGF-beta family ligands and its heparan sulfate chains bind bFGF. It acts as a reservoir of ligand for TGF-beta receptors.

- TGFβR3 (β-glycan)
