= Bone morphogenetic protein receptor =

Group of three receptors to bone morphogenetic proteins

TKL Ser/Thr protein kinase family

Identifiers
- Symbol: TKL
- Membranome: 1216

Bone morphogenetic protein receptors are serine-threonine kinase receptors. Transforming growth factor beta family proteins bind to these receptors. There are four bone morphogenetic protein receptors:

- Bone morphogenetic protein receptor, type 1:
  - ACVR1
  - BMPR1A
  - BMPR1B
- Bone morphogenetic protein receptor, type 2

== Structure ==
Both type 1 and 2 bone morphogenetic protein receptors have a single transmembrane segment. Additionally, both types have a cysteine-rich extracellular domain and a cytoplasmic serine threonine kinase domain. Type 1 contains a glycine-serine-rich domain to be phosphorylated by type 2 kinase domain, initiating the signaling transduction pathway of the SMAD signaling cascade. The wrist epitope motif on BMP-2 has a high-affinity binding site for BMPR-IA. The knuckle epitope motif on BMP-2 has a low-affinity binding site for BMPR-II.

== See also ==
- Bone morphogenetic protein
