= Activin type 1 receptors =

Human biological material

The Activin type I receptors transduce signals for a variety of members of the Transforming growth factor beta superfamily of ligands. This family of cytokines and hormones include activin, anti-Müllerian hormone (AMH), bone morphogenetic proteins (BMPs), and Nodal. They are involved in a host of physiological processes including, growth, cell differentiation, homeostasis, osteogenesis, apoptosis and many other functions. There are three type I Activin receptors: ACVR1, ACVR1B, and ACVR1C. Each bind to a specific type II receptor-ligand complex.

Despite the large amount of processes that these ligands regulate, they all operate through essentially the same pathway: A ligand binds to a Type two receptor, which recruits and trans-phosphorylate a type I receptor. The type I receptor recruits a receptor regulated SMAD (R-SMAD) which it phosphorylates. The RSMAD then translocates to the nucleus where it functions as a transcription factor.
