= IHBC =

IHBC may refer to:

- Institute of Historic Building Conservation, a professional body in the UK
- INHBC, a protein
