= INHBC =

Protein-coding gene in the species Homo sapiens

Identifiers
- Aliases: INHBC, IHBC, inhibin beta C, inhibin beta C subunit, inhibin subunit beta C
- External IDs: OMIM: 601233; MGI: 105932; GeneCards: INHBC

Gene location (Human)
Chr.	Chromosome 12 (human)
Band	12q13.3	Start	57,434,784 bp
Band	12q13.3	End	57,452,062 bp

Gene location (Mouse)
Chr.	Chromosome 10 (mouse)
Band	10 D3|10 74.5 cM	Start	127,192,191 bp
Band	10 D3|10 74.5 cM	End	127,206,300 bp
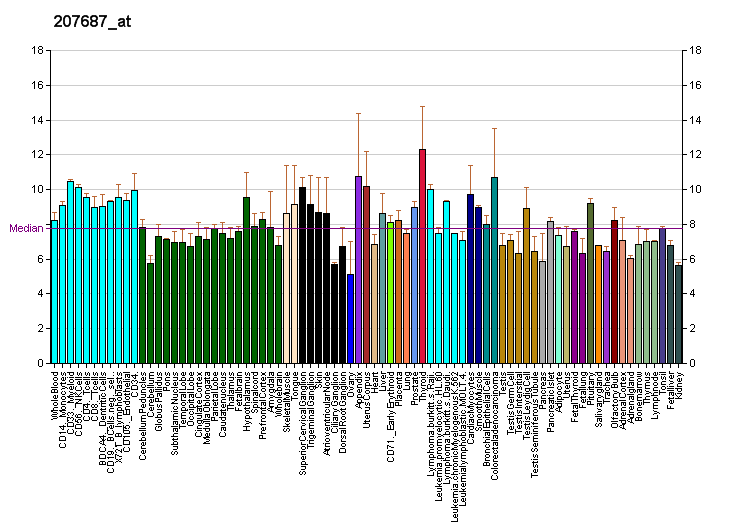
RNA expression pattern
Bgee	Human / Mouse (ortholog); Top expressed in: right lobe of liver; testicle; tibialis anterior muscle; pancreatic ductal cell; mucosa of ileum; deltoid muscle; skin of thigh; cerebellum; cerebellar cortex; right hemisphere of cerebellum / Top expressed in: liver; yolk sac; embryo; embryo; placenta; islet of Langerhans; More reference expression data
BioGPS	More reference expression data
Gene ontology
Molecular function	growth factor activity; transforming growth factor beta receptor binding; hormone activity; cytokine activity
Cellular component	extracellular region; extracellular space
Biological process	positive regulation of pathway-restricted SMAD protein phosphorylation; regulation of MAPK cascade; cell development; regulation of apoptotic process; SMAD protein signal transduction; regulation of signaling receptor activity
Sources:Amigo / QuickGO
Orthologs
Databases	NCBI: entry; OMA: entry
Species	Human	Mouse
Entrez	3626	16325
Ensembl	ENSG00000175189	ENSMUSG00000025405
UniProt	P55103	P55104
RefSeq (mRNA)	NM_005538	NM_010565
RefSeq (protein)	NP_005529	NP_034695
Location (UCSC)	Chr 12: 57.43 – 57.45 Mb	Chr 10: 127.19 – 127.21 Mb
PubMed search
- Wikidata
View/Edit Human	View/Edit Mouse

Inhibin beta C chain is a protein that in humans is encoded by the INHBC gene.

This gene encodes the beta C chain of inhibin, a member of the TGF-beta superfamily. This subunit forms heterodimers with beta A and beta B subunits. Inhibins and activins, also members of the TGF-beta superfamily, are hormones with opposing actions and are involved in hypothalamic, pituitary, and gonadal hormone secretion, as well as growth and differentiation of various cell types.
