= Inhibin alpha chain =

Protein and coding gene in humans

INHA

Identifiers
- Aliases: INHA, inhibin alpha subunit, inhibin subunit alpha
- External IDs: OMIM: 147380; MGI: 96569; GeneCards: INHA

Gene location (Human)
Chr.	Chromosome 2 (human)
Band	2q35	Start	219,569,162 bp
Band	2q35	End	219,575,711 bp

Gene location (Mouse)
Chr.	Chromosome 1 (mouse)
Band	1 C4|1 39.16 cM	Start	75,483,721 bp
Band	1 C4|1 39.16 cM	End	75,487,010 bp
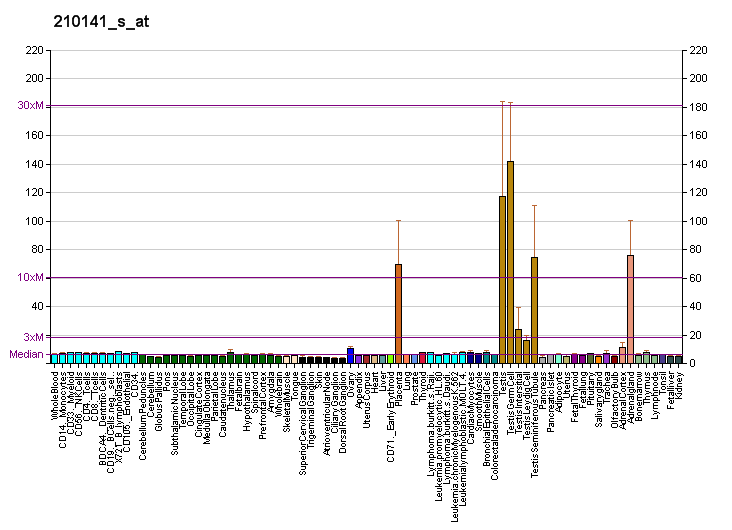
RNA expression pattern
Bgee	Human / Mouse (ortholog); Top expressed in: right testis; left testis; right adrenal gland; left ovary; right adrenal cortex; left adrenal gland; right ovary; left adrenal cortex; gonad; right auricle of heart / Top expressed in: cumulus cell; Gonadal ridge; ovary; testicle; seminiferous tubule; superior frontal gyrus; spermatocyte; primary visual cortex; membrana granulosa of ovarian follicle; adrenal gland; More reference expression data
BioGPS	More reference expression data
Gene ontology
Molecular function	cytokine activity; hormone activity; protein binding; protein heterodimerization activity; transforming growth factor beta receptor binding; growth factor activity; signaling receptor binding; inhibin binding
Cellular component	cytoplasm; inhibin-betaglycan-ActRII complex; photoreceptor inner segment; photoreceptor outer segment; extracellular region; soma; inhibin A complex; inhibin B complex; extracellular space
Biological process	regulation of apoptotic process; skeletal system development; cell differentiation; male gonad development; regulation of MAPK cascade; SMAD protein signal transduction; cell development; negative regulation of macrophage differentiation; cell-cell signaling; positive regulation of pathway-restricted SMAD protein phosphorylation; negative regulation of cell cycle; positive regulation of follicle-stimulating hormone secretion; regulation of cell cycle; cell surface receptor signaling pathway; regulation of cell population proliferation; hemoglobin biosynthetic process; negative regulation of B cell differentiation; ovarian follicle development; erythrocyte differentiation; negative regulation of follicle-stimulating hormone secretion; negative regulation of phosphorylation; signal transduction; BMP signaling pathway; regulation of signaling receptor activity
Sources:Amigo / QuickGO
Orthologs
Databases	NCBI: entry; OMA: entry
Species	Human	Mouse
Entrez	3623	16322
Ensembl	ENSG00000123999	ENSMUSG00000032968
UniProt	P05111	Q04997
RefSeq (mRNA)	NM_002191	NM_010564; NM_001329843
RefSeq (protein)	NP_002182	NP_001316772; NP_034694
Location (UCSC)	Chr 2: 219.57 – 219.58 Mb	Chr 1: 75.48 – 75.49 Mb
PubMed search
- Wikidata
View/Edit Human	View/Edit Mouse

Inhibin alpha chain, also known as INHA, is a protein which in humans is encoded by the INHA gene.

== Function ==
The inhibin alpha chain subunit joins either the beta A or beta B subunit to form a pituitary FSH secretion inhibitor. Inhibin has been shown to regulate gonadal stromal cell proliferation negatively and to have tumour-suppressor activity. In addition, serum levels of inhibin have been shown to reflect the size of granulosa-cell tumors and can therefore be used as a marker for primary as well as recurrent disease.

However, in prostate cancer, expression of the inhibin alpha-subunit gene was suppressed and was not detectable in poorly differentiated tumor cells. Furthermore, because expression in gonadal and various extragonadal tissues may vary severalfold in a tissue-specific fashion, it is proposed that inhibin may be both a growth/differentiation factor and a hormone.

== See also ==
- Inhibin
