= TGF beta receptor =

Protein family

transforming growth factor beta, receptor type I (activin A receptor type II-like kinase, 53kDa)

Identifiers
- Symbol: TGFBR1
- Alt. symbols: ALK5
- NCBI gene: 7046
- HGNC: 11772
- OMIM: 190181
- RefSeq: NM_004612
- UniProt: P36897

Other data
- Locus: Chr. 9 q22
Search for
- Structures: Swiss-model
- Domains: InterPro

transforming growth factor beta, receptor type II (70/80kDa)

Identifiers
- Symbol: TGFBR2
- Alt. symbols: MFS2
- NCBI gene: 7048
- HGNC: 11773
- OMIM: 190182
- RefSeq: NM_001024847
- UniProt: P37173

Other data
- Locus: Chr. 3 p24.1
Search for
- Structures: Swiss-model
- Domains: InterPro

transforming growth factor beta, receptor type III

Identifiers
- Symbol: TGFBR3
- Alt. symbols: β-Glycan
- NCBI gene: 7049
- HGNC: 11774
- OMIM: 600742
- RefSeq: NM_003243
- UniProt: Q03167

Other data
- Locus: Chr. 1 p33-p32
Search for
- Structures: Swiss-model
- Domains: InterPro

Transforming growth factor beta (TGFβ) receptors are single pass serine/threonine kinase receptors that belong to TGFβ receptor family. They exist in several different isoforms that can be homo- or heterodimeric. The number of characterized ligands in the TGFβ superfamily far exceeds the number of known receptors, suggesting the promiscuity that exists between the ligand and receptor interactions.

TGFβ is a growth factor and cytokine involved in paracrine signalling and can be found in many different tissue types, including brain, heart, kidney, liver, bone, and testes. Over-expression of TGFβ can induce renal fibrosis, causing kidney disease, as well as diabetes, and ultimately end-stage renal disease. Recent developments have found that, using certain types of protein antagonists against TGFβ receptors, can halt and in some cases reverse the effects of renal fibrosis.

Three TGFβ superfamily receptors specific for TGFβ, the TGFβ receptors, can be distinguished by their structural and functional properties. TGFβR1 (ALK5) and TGFβR2 have similar ligand-binding affinities and can be distinguished from each other only by peptide mapping. Both TGFβR1 and TGFβR2 have a high affinity for TGFβ1 and low affinity for TGFβ2. TGFβR3 (β-glycan) has a high affinity for both homodimeric TGFβ1 and TGFβ2 and in addition the heterodimer TGF-β1.2. The TGFβ receptors also bind TGFβ3.

== See also ==
- TGFβ superfamily receptor
- TGFβ signaling pathway
- TGFβ superfamily
