= KDP34 =

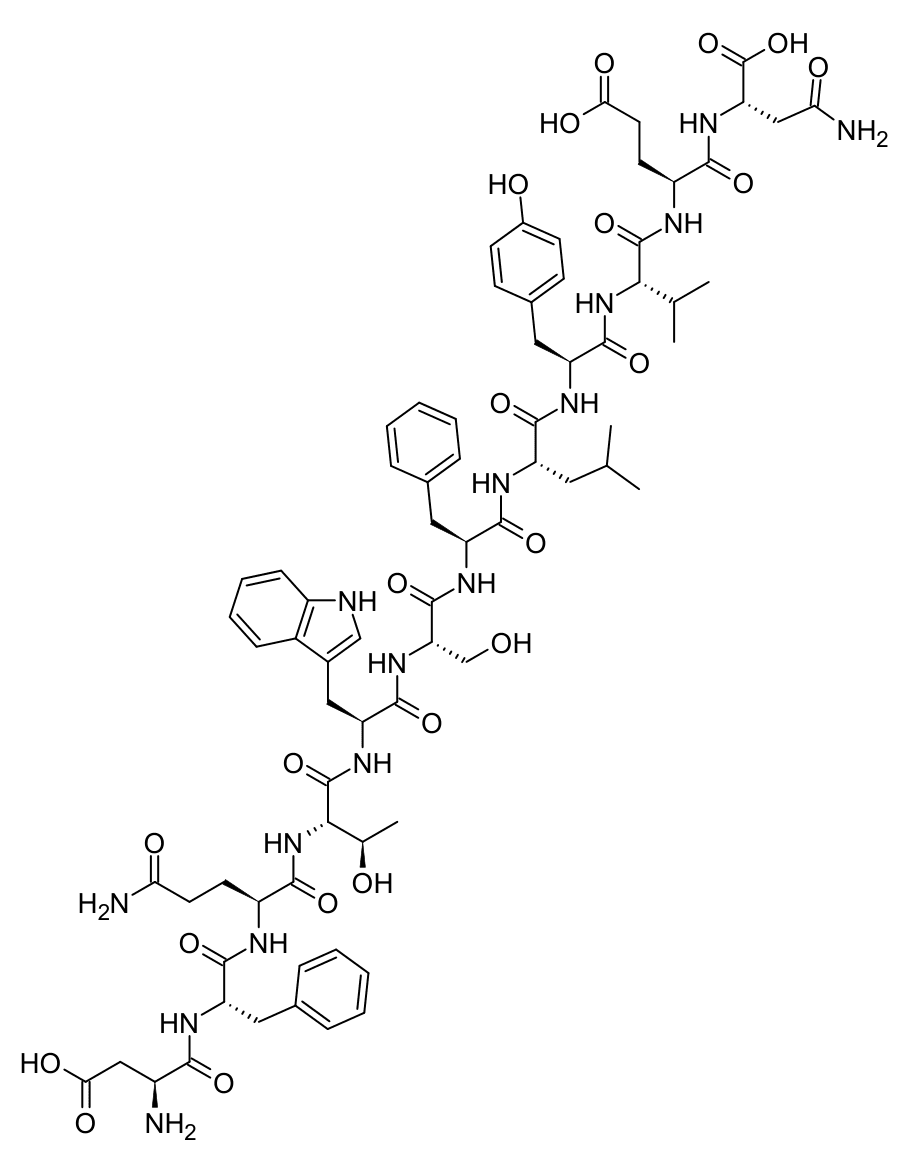

Chemical and physical data
- Formula: C_{74}H_{97}N_{15}O_{22}
- Molar mass: 1548.673 g·mol^{−1}
- 3D model (JSmol): Interactive image
- SMILES: O=C(N[C@@H](Cc1ccccc1)C(=O)N[C@@H](CCC(=O)N)C(=O)N[C@H](C(=O)N[C@@H](Cc1c[NH]c2ccccc21)C(=O)N[C@@H](CO)C(=O)N[C@@H](Cc1ccccc1)C(=O)N[C@@H](CC(C)C)C(=O)N[C@@H](Cc1ccc(O)cc1)C(=O)N[C@H](C(=O)N[C@@H](CCC(O)=O)C(=O)N[C@@H](CC(=O)N)C(O)=O)C(C)C)[C@H](O)C)[C@@H](N)CC(=O)O
- InChI: InChI=InChI=1S/C74H97N15O22/c1-37(2)28-50(66(102)83-53(31-42-20-22-44(92)23-21-42)70(106)88-61(38(3)4)72(108)80-49(25-27-59(95)96)64(100)86-55(74(110)111)34-58(77)94)82-68(104)52(30-41-16-10-7-11-17-41)84-71(107)56(36-90)87-69(105)54(32-43-35-78-47-19-13-12-18-45(43)47)85-73(109)62(39(5)91)89-65(101)48(24-26-57(76)93)79-67(103)51(29-40-14-8-6-9-15-40)81-63(99)46(75)33-60(97)98/h6-23,35,37-39,46,48-56,61-62,78,90-92H,24-34,36,75H2,1-5H3,(H2,76,93)(H2,77,94)(H,79,103)(H,80,108)(H,81,99)(H,82,104)(H,83,102)(H,84,107)(H,85,109)(H,86,100)(H,87,105)(H,88,106)(H,89,101)(H,95,96)(H,97,98)(H,110,111)/t39-,46+,48+,49+,50+,51+,52+,53+,54+,55+,56+,61+,62+/m1/s1; Key:HIUFCNAPIWVDMP-CTLYRQNCSA-N

KDP34 is a dodecapeptide with the sequence DFQTWSFLYVEN or Asp-Phe-Gln-Thr-Trp-Ser-Phe-Leu-Tyr-Val-Glu-Asn. It is a knuckle epitope peptide that is a modified fragment of bone morphogenetic protein 2 (BMP-2), with similar effects and higher potency. Recombinant BMP-2 is used clinically to enhance healing of bones, such as in bone transplants or bone grafts, but needs to be used very carefully due to side effects such as inflammation and inappropriate bone growth in non targeted tissues. Modified peptide analogues of BMP-2 such as KDP34 have been developed as potential alternatives which may show more selectivity and an improved side effect profile.
