= INHBB =

Protein-coding gene in the species Homo sapiens

Identifiers
- Aliases: INHBB, inhibin beta B subunit, inhibin subunit beta B
- External IDs: OMIM: 147390; MGI: 96571; GeneCards: INHBB

Gene location (Human)
Chr.	Chromosome 2 (human)
Band	2q14.2	Start	120,346,136 bp
Band	2q14.2	End	120,351,803 bp

Gene location (Mouse)
Chr.	Chromosome 1 (mouse)
Band	1 E2.3|1 52.29 cM	Start	119,343,195 bp
Band	1 E2.3|1 52.29 cM	End	119,349,978 bp
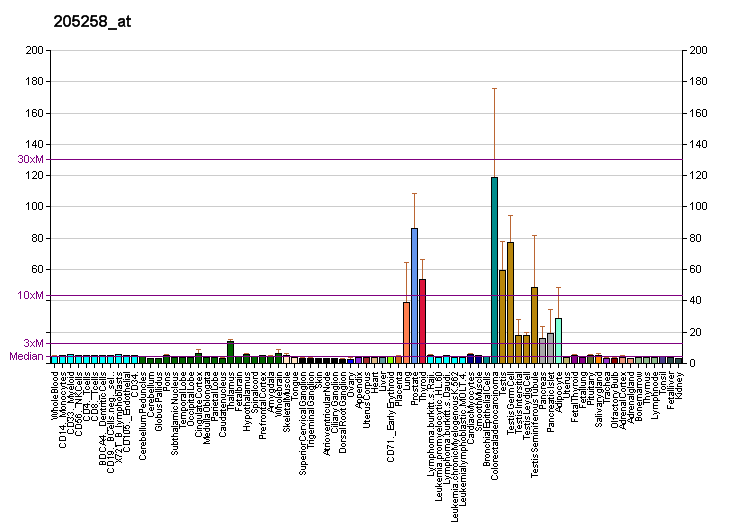
RNA expression pattern
Bgee	Human / Mouse (ortholog); Top expressed in: pericardium; ventricular zone; lactiferous duct; bronchial epithelial cell; subcutaneous adipose tissue; mucosa of paranasal sinus; abdominal fat; ganglionic eminence; left lobe of thyroid gland; skin of leg / Top expressed in: cervix; Gonadal ridge; decidua; cumulus cell; membrana granulosa of ovarian follicle; calvaria; ventricular zone; white adipose tissue; ciliary body; pineal gland; More reference expression data
BioGPS	More reference expression data
Gene ontology
Molecular function	host cell surface receptor binding; cytokine activity; protein homodimerization activity; hormone activity; protein binding; transforming growth factor beta receptor binding; growth factor activity
Cellular component	extracellular region; perinuclear region of cytoplasm; cell periphery; extracellular space
Biological process	regulation of apoptotic process; defense response; cell differentiation; negative regulation of insulin secretion; regulation of MAPK cascade; SMAD protein signal transduction; cell development; cellular response to starvation; positive regulation of pathway-restricted SMAD protein phosphorylation; positive regulation of apoptotic signaling pathway; positive regulation of follicle-stimulating hormone secretion; cellular response to leptin stimulus; oocyte development; positive regulation of ovulation; cellular response to insulin stimulus; ovarian follicle development; negative regulation of follicle-stimulating hormone secretion; fat cell differentiation; activin receptor signaling pathway; regulation of signaling receptor activity; adhesion of symbiont to host cell; response to wounding
Sources:Amigo / QuickGO
Orthologs
Databases	NCBI: entry; OMA: entry
Species	Human	Mouse
Entrez	3625	16324
Ensembl	ENSG00000163083	ENSMUSG00000037035
UniProt	P09529	Q04999
RefSeq (mRNA)	NM_002193	NM_008381
RefSeq (protein)	NP_002184	NP_032407
Location (UCSC)	Chr 2: 120.35 – 120.35 Mb	Chr 1: 119.34 – 119.35 Mb
PubMed search
- Wikidata
View/Edit Human	View/Edit Mouse

Inhibin, beta B, also known as INHBB, is a protein which in humans is encoded by the INHBB gene. INHBB is a subunit of both activin and inhibin, two closely related glycoproteins with opposing biological effects.

== Function ==
=== Inhibin ===
Inhibins are heterodimeric glycoproteins composed of an α subunit (INHA) and one of two homologous, but distinct, β subunits (βA or βB, this protein). mRNA for the two subunits has been demonstrated in the testes of adult rats. Inhibin can bind specifically to testicular interstitial cells throughout development and may be an important regulator of Leydig cell testosterone production or interstitial cell function.

The inhibin beta B subunit joins the α subunit to form a pituitary FSH secretion inhibitor. Inhibin has been shown to regulate gonadal stromal cell proliferation negatively and to have tumour-suppressor activity. In addition, serum levels of inhibin have been shown to reflect the size of granulosa-cell tumors and can therefore be used as a marker for primary as well as recurrent disease. Because expression in gonadal and various extragonadal tissues may vary severalfold in a tissue-specific fashion, it is proposed that inhibin may be both a growth/differentiation factor and a hormone.

=== Activin ===
Furthermore, the beta B subunit forms a homodimer, activin B, and also joins with the beta A subunit to form a heterodimer, activin AB, both of which stimulate FSH secretion.

== Tissue distribution ==
Sections of testicular tissue from rat revealed positive immunoreactivity against anti-inhibin intensely appeared in Leydig cells. In adult animals, binding of ^{125}I inhibin was localized primarily to the interstitial compartment of the testis. Also, Jin et al., (2001) reported that Leydig cells showed strong positive staining for the inhibin βA subunit in pigs testis.

== Receptors ==
In situ ligand binding studies have shown that ^{125}I inhibin βA binds specifically to Leydig cells throughout rat testis development. These results suggest that inhibin has been considered as a regulator of Leydig cell differentiated function. Recently, additional inhibin specific binding proteins were identified in inhibin target tissues, including pituitary and Leydig cells. From these receptors betaglycan (the TGF-β type III receptor) and InhBP/p120 (a membrane-tethered proteoglycan) were identified as putative inhibin receptors and they are all present in Leydig cells. However, a faint positive reaction was detected in Leydig cell cytoplasm in rats treated with anise oil. This may be related to the damaged Leydig cells, as a result of the decreasing of inhibin expression. This may be related to its content of safrole.

== Cancer ==
INHBB gene has been observed progressively downregulated in Human papillomavirus-positive neoplastic keratinocytes derived from uterine cervical preneoplastic lesions at different levels of malignancy. For this reason, INHBB is likely to be associated with tumorigenesis and may be a potential prognostic marker for uterine cervical preneoplastic lesions progression.
