= Bone morphogenetic protein receptor, type 1 =

Group of type I transmembrane proteins

Bone morphogenetic protein type I receptors are single pass, type I transmembrane proteins. They belong to a class of receptor serine/threonine kinases that bind members of the TGF beta superfamily of ligands—the bone morphogenetic proteins.

The three types of type I BMP receptors are ACVR1, BMPR1A and BMPR1B.
