= Paracrine regulator =

Molecule or hormone produced by a tissue to regulate activity in that same tissue

A paracrine regulator is a molecule or hormone produced by a tissue to regulate activity in that same tissue. Paracrine regulators are distinct from endocrine regulators, which secrete substances directly into the blood stream, thus accessing other tissues as well. Some paracrine regulators can also be autocrine regulators, which are produced by cells to induce changes within themselves.
