= Activin and inhibin =

Regulators of feedback on FSH-production

inhibin, alpha

Identifiers
- Symbol: INHA
- NCBI gene: 3623
- HGNC: 6065
- OMIM: 147380
- RefSeq: NM_002191
- UniProt: P05111

Other data
- Locus: Chr. 2 q33-qter
Search for
- Structures: Swiss-model
- Domains: InterPro

inhibin, beta A
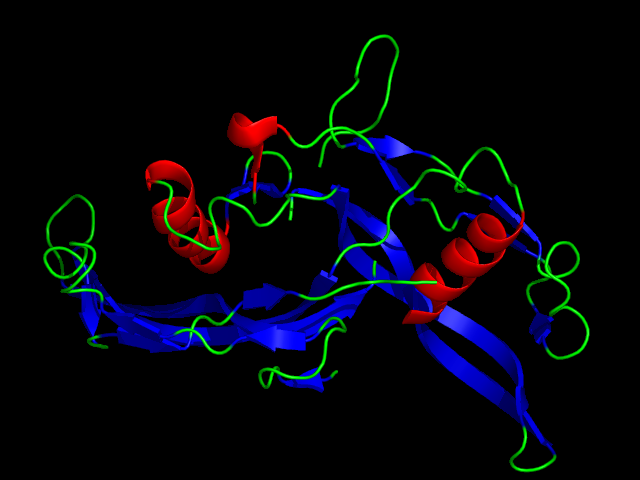
- The Activin dimer, from 2ARV.pdb

Identifiers
- Symbol: INHBA
- Alt. symbols: activin A
- NCBI gene: 3624
- HGNC: 6066
- OMIM: 147290
- RefSeq: NM_002192
- UniProt: P08476

Other data
- Locus: Chr. 7 p15-p13
Search for
- Structures: Swiss-model
- Domains: InterPro

inhibin, beta B

Identifiers
- Symbol: INHBB
- Alt. symbols: activin B
- NCBI gene: 3625
- HGNC: 6067
- OMIM: 147390
- RefSeq: NM_002193
- UniProt: P09529

Other data
- Locus: Chr. 2 cen-q13
Search for
- Structures: Swiss-model
- Domains: InterPro

inhibin, beta C

Identifiers
- Symbol: INHBC
- Alt. symbols: activin C
- NCBI gene: 3626
- HGNC: 6068
- OMIM: 601233
- RefSeq: NM_005538
- UniProt: P55103

Other data
- Locus: Chr. 12 q13
Search for
- Structures: Swiss-model
- Domains: InterPro

inhibin, beta E

Identifiers
- Symbol: INHBE
- Alt. symbols: activin E
- NCBI gene: 83729
- HGNC: 24029
- OMIM: 612031
- RefSeq: NM_031479
- UniProt: P58166

Other data
- Locus: Chr. 12 q13.2
Search for
- Structures: Swiss-model
- Domains: InterPro

Activin and inhibin are two closely related protein complexes that have almost directly opposite biological effects. Identified in 1986, activin enhances FSH biosynthesis and secretion, and participates in the regulation of the menstrual cycle. Many other functions have been found to be exerted by activin, including roles in cell proliferation, differentiation, apoptosis, metabolism, homeostasis, immune response, wound repair, and endocrine function. Conversely, inhibin downregulates FSH synthesis and inhibits FSH secretion. The existence of inhibin was hypothesized as early as 1916; however, it was not demonstrated to exist until Neena Schwartz and Cornelia Channing's work in the mid-1970s, after which both proteins were molecularly characterized ten years later. Early in the process of its discovery, inhibin produced by the ovaries was also referred to as folliculostatin.

Activin is a dimer composed of two identical or very similar beta subunits. Inhibin is also a dimer wherein the first component is a beta subunit similar or identical to the beta subunit in activin. However, in contrast to activin, the second component of the inhibin dimer is a more distantly-related alpha subunit. Activin, inhibin and a number of other structurally related proteins such as anti-Müllerian hormone, bone morphogenetic protein, and growth differentiation factor belong to the TGF-β protein superfamily.

== Structure ==
The activin and inhibin protein complexes are both dimeric in structure, and, in each complex, the two monomers are linked to one another by a single disulfide bond. In addition, both complexes are derived from the same family of related genes and proteins but differ in their subunit composition. Below is a list of the most common inhibin and activin complexes and their subunit composition:

Class	Activity	Complex	Dimer subunits	
Class	Activity	Complex	1	2
Inhibin	inhibits FSH secretion	Inhibin A	α	β_{A}
Inhibin	inhibits FSH secretion	Inhibin B	α	β_{B}
Activin	stimulates FSH secretion	Activin A	β_{A}	β_{A}
Activin	stimulates FSH secretion	Activin AB	β_{A}	β_{B}
Activin	stimulates FSH secretion	Activin B	β_{B}	β_{B}

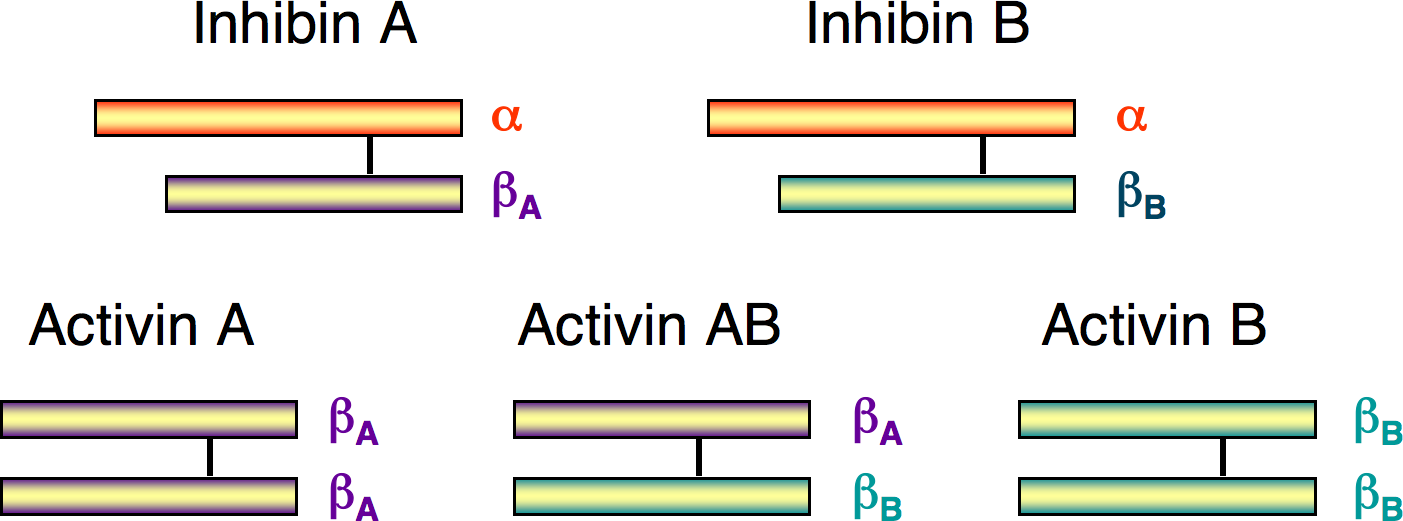
Schematic diagram of the 1D structures of inhibin and activin. The black line between the monomers represents a disulfide bond.

The alpha and beta subunits share approximately 25% sequence similarity, whereas the similarity between beta subunits is approximately 65%.

In mammals, four beta subunits have been described, called activin β_{A}, activin β_{B}, activin β_{C} and activin β_{E}. Activin β_{A} and β_{B} are identical to the two beta subunits of inhibin. A fifth subunit, activin β_{D}, has been described in Xenopus laevis. Two activin β_{A} subunits give rise to activin A, one β_{A}, and one β_{B} subunit gives rise to activin AB, and so on. Various, but not all theoretically possible, heterodimers have been described. The subunits are linked by a single covalent disulfide bond.

The β_{C} subunit is able to form activin heterodimers with β_{A} or β_{B} subunits but is unable to dimerize with inhibin α.

== Function ==
=== Activin ===
Activin is produced in the gonads, pituitary gland, placenta, and other organs:

- In the ovarian follicle, activin increases FSH binding and FSH-induced aromatization. It participates in androgen synthesis enhancing LH action in the ovary and testis. In the male, activin enhances spermatogenesis.
- Activin is strongly expressed in wounded skin, and overexpression of activin in epidermis of transgenic mice improves wound healing and enhances scar formation. Its action in wound repair and skin morphogenesis is through stimulation of keratinocytes and stromal cells in a dose-dependent manner.
- Activin also regulates the morphogenesis of branching organs such as the prostate, lung, and especially kidney. Activin A increased the expression level of type-I collagen suggesting that activin A acts as a potent activator of fibroblasts.
- Lack of activin during development results in neural developmental defects.
- Upregulation of Activin A drives pluripotent stem cells into a mesoendodermal fate, and thus provides a useful tool for stem cell differentiation and organoid formation.

=== Inhibin ===
In both females and males, inhibin inhibits FSH production. Inhibin does not inhibit the secretion of GnRH from the hypothalamus. However, the overall mechanism differs between the sexes:

==== In females ====
Inhibin is produced in the gonads, pituitary gland, placenta, corpus luteum and other organs.

FSH stimulates the secretion of inhibin from the granulosa cells of the ovarian follicles in the ovaries. In turn, inhibin suppresses FSH.

- Inhibin B reaches a peak in the early- to mid-follicular phase, and a second peak at ovulation.
- Inhibin A reaches its peak in the mid-luteal phase.

Inhibin secretion is diminished by GnRH, and enhanced by insulin-like growth factor-1 (IGF-1).

==== In males ====
It is secreted from the Sertoli cells, located in the seminiferous tubules inside the testes. Androgens stimulate inhibin production; this protein may also help to locally regulate spermatogenesis.

== Mechanism of action ==
=== Activin ===
As with other members of the superfamily, activins interact with two types of cell surface transmembrane receptors (Types I and II) which have intrinsic serine/threonine kinase activities in their cytoplasmic domains:

- Activin type 1 receptors: ACVR1, ACVR1B, ACVR1C
- Activin type 2 receptors: ACVR2A, ACVR2B

Activin binds to the Type II receptor and initiates a cascade reaction that leads to the recruitment, phosphorylation, and activation of Type I activin receptor. This then interacts with and then phosphorylates SMAD2 and SMAD3, two of the cytoplasmic SMAD proteins.

Smad3 then translocates to the nucleus and interacts with SMAD4 through multimerization, resulting in their modulation as transcription factor complexes responsible for the expression of a large variety of genes.

=== Inhibin ===
In contrast to activin, much less is known about the mechanism of action of inhibin, but may involve competing with activin for binding to activin receptors and/or binding to inhibin-specific receptors.

== Clinical significance ==
=== Activin ===
Activin A is more plentiful in the adipose tissue of obese, compared to lean persons. Activin A promotes the proliferation of adipocyte progenitor cells, while inhibiting their differentiation into adipocytes. Activin A also increases inflammatory cytokines in macrophages.

A mutation in the gene for the activin receptor ACVR1 results in fibrodysplasia ossificans progressiva, a fatal disease that causes muscle and soft tissue to gradually be replaced by bone tissue. This condition is characterized by the formation of an extra skeleton that produces immobilization and eventually death by suffocation. The mutation in ACVR1 causes FKBP1A, which normally acts as an antagonist of the receptor and blocks osteogenesis (bone growth), to behave as an agonist of the receptor and to induce hyperactive bone growth. On 2 September 2015, Regeneron Pharmaceuticals announced that they had developed an antibody for activin A that effectively cures the disease in an animal model of the condition.

Mutations in the ACVR1 gene have also been linked to cancer, especially diffuse intrinsic pontine glioma (DIPG).

Elevated Activin B levels with normal Activin A levels provided a possible biomarker for myalgic encephalomyelitis/chronic fatigue syndrome.

Activin A is overexpressed in many cancers. It was shown to promote tumorigenesis by hampering the adaptive anti-tumor immune response in melanoma.

=== Inhibin ===
Quantification of inhibin A is part of the prenatal quad screen that can be administered during pregnancy at a gestational age of 16–18 weeks. An elevated inhibin A (along with an increased beta-hCG, decreased AFP, and a decreased estriol) is suggestive of the presence of a fetus with Down syndrome. As a screening test, abnormal quad screen test results need to be followed up with more definitive tests.

It also has been used as a marker for ovarian cancer.

Inhibin B may be used as a marker of spermatogenesis function and male infertility. The mean serum inhibin B level is significantly higher among fertile men (approximately 140 pg/mL) than in infertile men (approximately 80 pg/mL). In men with azoospermia, a positive test for inhibin B slightly raises the chances for successfully achieving pregnancy through testicular sperm extraction (TESE), although the association is not very substantial, having a sensitivity of 0.65 (95% confidence interval [CI]: 0.56–0.74) and a specificity of 0.83 (CI: 0.64–0.93) for prediction the presence of sperm in the testes in non-obstructive azoospermia.
