= Transforming growth factor, beta 3 =

Protein-coding gene in the species Homo sapiens

TGFB3
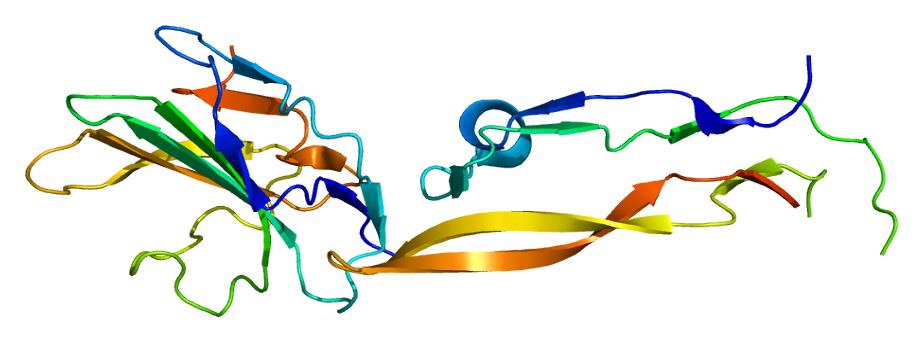

Identifiers
- Aliases: TGFB3, ARVD, ARVD1, RNHF, TGF-beta3, Transforming growth factor, beta 3, LDS5, transforming growth factor beta 3, TGF beta 3
- External IDs: OMIM: 190230; MGI: 98727; GeneCards: TGFB3
Available structures
PDB	Ortholog search: PDBe RCSB
PDB	List of PDB id codes 1KTZ, 1TGJ, 1TGK, 2PJY, 3EO1, 4UM9

Gene location (Human)
Chr.	Chromosome 14 (human)
Band	14q24.3	Start	75,958,097 bp
Band	14q24.3	End	75,983,011 bp

Gene location (Mouse)
Chr.	Chromosome 12 (mouse)
Band	12 D2|12 40.09 cM	Start	86,103,519 bp
Band	12 D2|12 40.09 cM	End	86,125,815 bp
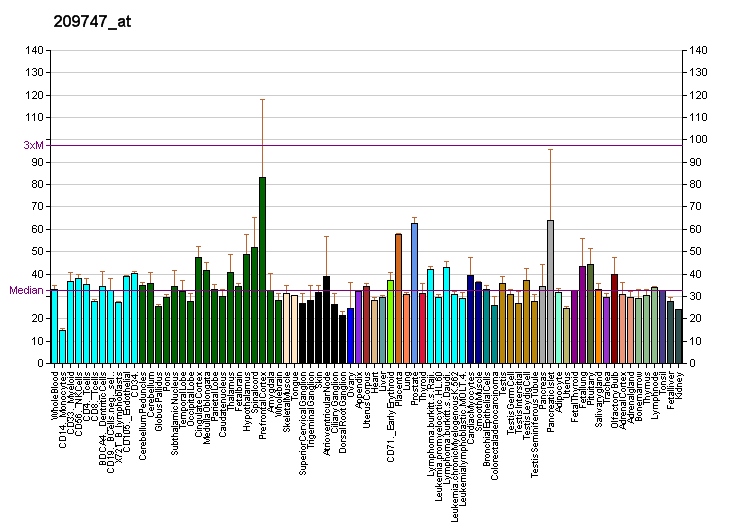
RNA expression pattern
Bgee	Human / Mouse (ortholog); Top expressed in: saphenous vein; canal of the cervix; gallbladder; prostate; cartilage tissue; smooth muscle tissue; body of pancreas; periodontal fiber; body of uterus; C1 segment / Top expressed in: external carotid artery; molar; aortic valve; internal carotid artery; lactiferous gland; ascending aorta; ankle; umbilical cord; ankle joint; calvaria; More reference expression data
BioGPS	More reference expression data
Gene ontology
Molecular function	type III transforming growth factor beta receptor binding; cytokine activity; type I transforming growth factor beta receptor binding; protein binding; protein heterodimerization activity; transforming growth factor beta receptor binding; growth factor activity; transforming growth factor beta binding; type II transforming growth factor beta receptor binding; identical protein binding
Cellular component	cytoplasm; extracellular matrix; T-tubule; plasma membrane; secretory granule; cell surface; soma; platelet alpha granule lumen; nucleus; extracellular region; extracellular space; intracellular membrane-bounded organelle; collagen-containing extracellular matrix
Biological process	regulation of apoptotic process; negative regulation of neuron apoptotic process; positive regulation of collagen biosynthetic process; cell-cell junction organization; regulation of MAPK cascade; SMAD protein signal transduction; positive regulation of bone mineralization; embryonic neurocranium morphogenesis; response to progesterone; female pregnancy; response to laminar fluid shear stress; ageing; platelet degranulation; in utero embryonic development; negative regulation of transforming growth factor beta receptor signaling pathway; wound healing; salivary gland morphogenesis; mammary gland development; odontogenesis; response to estrogen; positive regulation of protein secretion; ossification involved in bone remodeling; uterine wall breakdown; frontal suture morphogenesis; inner ear development; negative regulation of macrophage cytokine production; lung alveolus development; digestive tract development; transforming growth factor beta receptor signaling pathway; positive regulation of filopodium assembly; positive regulation of cell division; face morphogenesis; detection of hypoxia; positive regulation of transcription by RNA polymerase II; positive regulation of SMAD protein signal transduction; positive regulation of tight junction disassembly; positive regulation of epithelial to mesenchymal transition; positive regulation of stress fiber assembly; regulation of epithelial to mesenchymal transition involved in endocardial cushion formation; positive regulation of apoptotic process; response to hypoxia; positive regulation of pathway-restricted SMAD protein phosphorylation; positive regulation of transcription, DNA-templated; negative regulation of vascular associated smooth muscle cell proliferation; BMP signaling pathway; cell development; regulation of signaling receptor activity; positive regulation of cell population proliferation; negative regulation of cell population proliferation; secondary palate development; regulation of cell population proliferation
Sources:Amigo / QuickGO
Orthologs
Databases	NCBI: entry; OMA: entry
Species	Human	Mouse
Entrez	7043	21809
Ensembl	ENSG00000119699	ENSMUSG00000021253
UniProt	P10600	P17125
RefSeq (mRNA)	NM_003239; NM_001329938; NM_001329939	NM_009368
RefSeq (protein)	NP_001316867; NP_001316868; NP_003230	n/a
Location (UCSC)	Chr 14: 75.96 – 75.98 Mb	Chr 12: 86.1 – 86.13 Mb
PubMed search
- Wikidata
View/Edit Human	View/Edit Mouse

Transforming growth factor beta-3 is a protein that in humans is encoded by the TGFB3 gene.

It is a type of protein, known as a cytokine, which is involved in cell differentiation, embryogenesis and development. It belongs to a large family of cytokines called the Transforming growth factor beta superfamily, which includes the TGF-β family, Bone morphogenetic proteins (BMPs), growth and differentiation factors (GDFs), inhibins and activins.

TGF-β3 is believed to regulate molecules involved in cellular adhesion and extracellular matrix (ECM) formation during the process of palate development. Without TGF-β3, mammals develop a deformity known as a cleft palate. This is caused by failure of epithelial cells in both sides of the developing palate to fuse. TGF-β3 also plays an essential role in controlling the development of lungs in mammals, by also regulating cell adhesion and ECM formation in this tissue, and controls wound healing by regulating the movements of epidermal and dermal cells in injured skin.

== Interactions ==
Transforming growth factor, beta 3 has been shown to interact with TGF beta receptor 2.

== Clinical research ==
After successful phase I/II trials, human recombinant TGF-β3 (avotermin, planned trade name Juvista) failed in Phase III trials.
