= Activin type 2 receptors =

Protein family

activin A receptor, type IIA

Identifiers
- Symbol: ACVR2A
- Alt. symbols: ACVR2
- NCBI gene: 92
- HGNC: 173
- OMIM: 102581
- RefSeq: NM_001616
- UniProt: P27037

Other data
- Locus: Chr. 2 q22.2-23.3
Search for
- Structures: Swiss-model
- Domains: InterPro

activin A receptor, type IIB

Identifiers
- Symbol: ACVR2B
- NCBI gene: 93
- HGNC: 174
- OMIM: 602730
- RefSeq: NM_001106
- UniProt: Q13705

Other data
- Locus: Chr. 3 p22
Search for
- Structures: Swiss-model
- Domains: InterPro

The activin type 2 receptors belong to a larger TGF-beta receptor family and modulate signals for transforming growth factor beta ligands. These receptors are involved in a host of physiological processes including, growth, cell differentiation, homeostasis, osteogenesis, apoptosis and many other functions. There are two activin type two receptors: ACVR2A and ACVR2B.

Despite the large amount of processes that these ligands regulate, they all operate through essentially the same pathway: A ligand binds to a type 2 receptor, which recruits and trans-phosphorylates a type I receptor. The type I receptor recruits a receptor regulated SMAD (R-SMAD) which it phosphorylates. The RSMAD then translocates to the nucleus where it functions as a transcription factor.

== Function ==
Several ligands that signal through the activin type 2 receptors regulate muscle growth. Myostatin, a TGF-beta superfamily member, is a negative regulator of muscle growth. Myostatin binds to ACVR2B and to a lesser extent ACVR2A. In mice that were ACVR2A ^{−/−} (null) mutants there was an increase in all four muscle groups studied (pectoralis, triceps, quadriceps, and gastrocnemious/plantaris muscles). Two of these muscle groups (pectoralis and triceps) were increased in ACVR2B ^{−/−} (null) mutants.

Activin plays a significant role in reproduction. ACVR2 receptors are present in the testis during testicular development. ACR2A and ACVR2B was found to be localized primarily in the gonocytes as well as in sertoli cells. These cells are responsive to both autocrine and paracrine activin B signaling, which controls their proliferation. Cells of the epididymis also have ACVR2A receptors present. ACVR2B receptors were found to be localized in the rete testis.

== Clinical significance ==
The ACVR2 gene is often found inactivated in prostate cancer and tumors with microsatellite instability.

In a lab, it has been shown that truncated mutations in the ACVR2 gene causes a significant reduction in activin mediated cell signaling. In 58.1% of microsatellite unstable (MSI-H) colorectal cancers the ACVR2A gene has been found mutated. It also plays a role in non-MSI-H colorectal cancers.

== Inhibitors ==
- Stamulumab (MYO-029) myostatin Inhibitor
