= Bone morphogenetic protein 2 =

Protein found in humans

BMP2
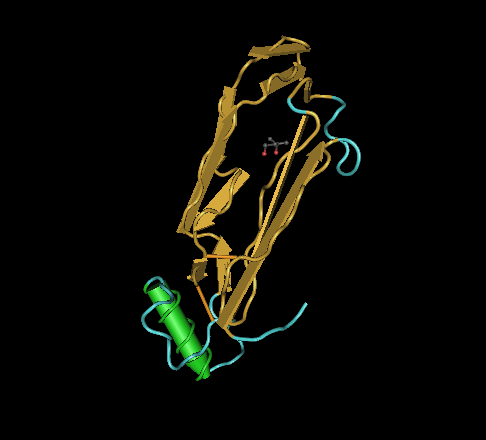

Identifiers
- Aliases: BMP2, BDA2, BMP2A, bone morphogenetic protein 2, SSFSC, SSFSC1
- External IDs: OMIM: 112261; MGI: 88177; GeneCards: BMP2
Available structures
PDB	Ortholog search: PDBe RCSB
PDB	List of PDB id codes 1ES7, 1REU, 1REW, 2GOO, 2H62, 2H64, 2QJ9, 2QJA, 2QJB, 3BK3, 3BMP, 4MID, 4N1D, 4UHY, 4UHZ, 4UI0, 4UI1, 4UI2

Gene location (Human)
Chr.	Chromosome 20 (human)
Band	20p12.3	Start	6,767,686 bp
Band	20p12.3	End	6,780,246 bp

Gene location (Mouse)
Chr.	Chromosome 2 (mouse)
Band	2 F2|2 65.21 cM	Start	133,394,079 bp
Band	2 F2|2 65.21 cM	End	133,404,805 bp
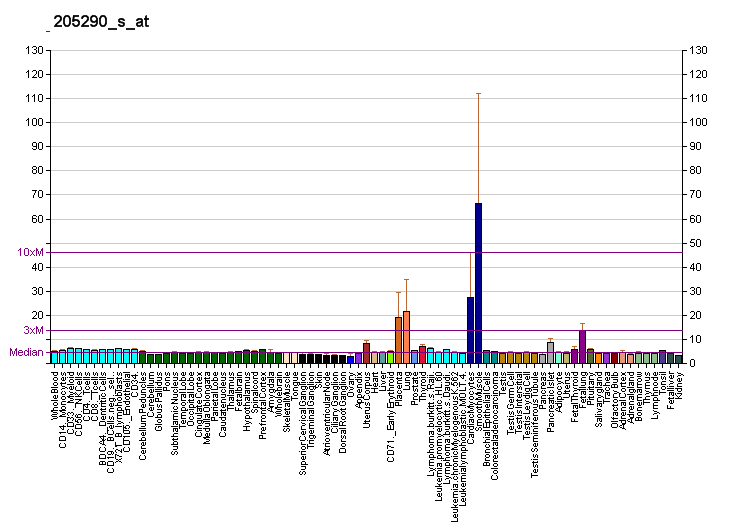

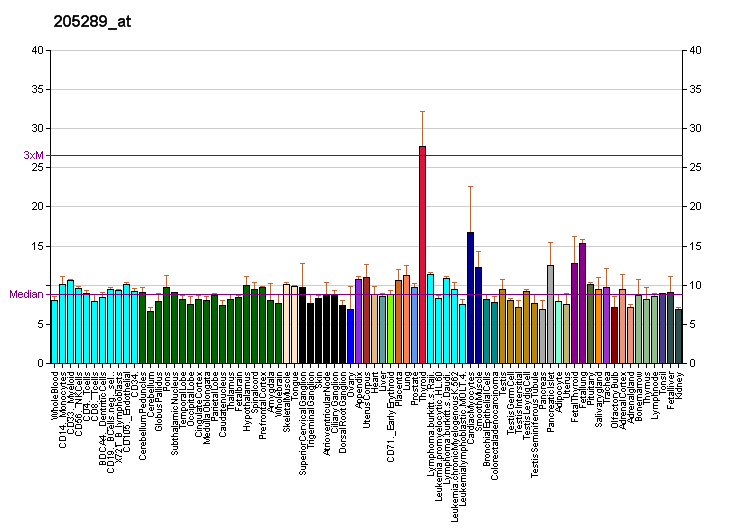
RNA expression pattern
Bgee	Human / Mouse (ortholog); Top expressed in: cartilage tissue; pancreatic ductal cell; retinal pigment epithelium; mucosa of sigmoid colon; lower lobe of lung; pylorus; periodontal fiber; mucosa of urinary bladder; stromal cell of endometrium; glomerulus / Top expressed in: gastrula; transitional epithelium of urinary bladder; epithelium of stomach; left colon; ciliary body; mucous cell of stomach; Apical ectodermal ridge; sebaceous gland; retinal pigment epithelium; pyloric antrum; More reference expression data
BioGPS	More reference expression data
Gene ontology
Molecular function	signaling receptor binding; cytokine activity; co-receptor binding; phosphatase activator activity; growth factor activity; BMP receptor binding; protein binding; NAD-retinol dehydrogenase activity; SMAD binding; protein heterodimerization activity; transforming growth factor beta receptor binding
Cellular component	extracellular region; cell surface; BMP receptor complex; extracellular space; intracellular membrane-bounded organelle
Biological process	skeletal system development; positive regulation of Wnt signaling pathway by BMP signaling pathway; positive regulation of protein phosphorylation; mesenchyme development; negative regulation of cell cycle; odontogenesis of dentin-containing tooth; telencephalon regionalization; protein phosphorylation; atrioventricular valve morphogenesis; proteoglycan metabolic process; mesenchymal cell differentiation; pericardium development; positive regulation of ERK1 and ERK2 cascade; BMP signaling pathway involved in heart induction; animal organ morphogenesis; inner ear development; cardiocyte differentiation; negative regulation of canonical Wnt signaling pathway; negative regulation of cell population proliferation; positive regulation of p38MAPK cascade; pathway-restricted SMAD protein phosphorylation; cell fate commitment; regulation of transcription, DNA-templated; SMAD protein signal transduction; ossification; in utero embryonic development; mesenchymal cell proliferation involved in ureteric bud development; regulation of odontogenesis of dentin-containing tooth; positive regulation of transcription, DNA-templated; positive regulation of Wnt signaling pathway; development of the heart; telencephalon development; branching involved in ureteric bud morphogenesis; negative regulation of Wnt signaling pathway involved in heart development; cartilage development; bone mineralization involved in bone maturation; positive regulation of cartilage development; positive regulation of neuron differentiation; positive regulation of cell differentiation; thyroid-stimulating hormone-secreting cell differentiation; inflammatory response; positive regulation of fat cell differentiation; negative regulation of steroid biosynthetic process; positive regulation of MAPK cascade; Notch signaling pathway; bone mineralization; cell differentiation; chondrocyte differentiation; corticotropin hormone secreting cell differentiation; positive regulation of astrocyte differentiation; positive regulation of bone mineralization; cellular response to organic cyclic compound; positive regulation of ossification; negative regulation of transcription by RNA polymerase II; positive regulation of epithelial to mesenchymal transition; positive regulation of phosphatase activity; negative regulation of calcium-independent cell-cell adhesion; positive regulation of osteoblast differentiation; protein destabilization; embryonic heart tube anterior/posterior pattern specification; osteoblast differentiation; epithelial to mesenchymal transition; positive regulation of protein binding; negative regulation of transcription, DNA-templated; positive regulation of odontogenesis; positive regulation of transcription from RNA polymerase II promoter involved in cellular response to chemical stimulus; negative regulation of aldosterone biosynthetic process; positive regulation of osteoblast proliferation; response to hypoxia; positive regulation of endothelial cell proliferation; positive regulation of cell migration; negative regulation of cortisol biosynthetic process; cell-cell signaling; positive regulation of pathway-restricted SMAD protein phosphorylation; cellular response to growth factor stimulus; cellular response to BMP stimulus; cardiac muscle tissue morphogenesis; endocardial cushion morphogenesis; multicellular organism development; negative regulation of cardiac muscle cell differentiation; positive regulation of apoptotic process; negative regulation of insulin-like growth factor receptor signaling pathway; positive regulation of transcription by RNA polymerase II; cardiac epithelial to mesenchymal transition; positive regulation of pri-miRNA transcription by RNA polymerase II; positive regulation of gene expression; BMP signaling pathway; cardiac muscle cell differentiation; cell development; regulation of signaling receptor activity; negative regulation of gene expression; response to bacterium; regulation of apoptotic process; regulation of MAPK cascade
Sources:Amigo / QuickGO
Orthologs
Databases	NCBI: entry; OMA: entry
Species	Human	Mouse
Entrez	650	12156
Ensembl	ENSG00000125845	ENSMUSG00000027358
UniProt	P12643	P21274
RefSeq (mRNA)	NM_001200	NM_007553
RefSeq (protein)	NP_001191	NP_031579
Location (UCSC)	Chr 20: 6.77 – 6.78 Mb	Chr 2: 133.39 – 133.4 Mb
PubMed search
- Wikidata
View/Edit Human	View/Edit Mouse

Bone morphogenetic protein 2 or BMP-2 belongs to the TGF-β superfamily of proteins.

== Function ==
BMP-2 like other bone morphogenetic proteins, plays an important role in the development of bone and cartilage. It is involved in the hedgehog pathway, TGF beta signaling pathway, and in cytokine-cytokine receptor interaction. It is also involved in cardiac cell differentiation and epithelial to mesenchymal transition.

Like many other proteins from the BMP family, BMP-2 has been demonstrated to potently induce osteoblast differentiation in a variety of cell types.

BMP-2 may be involved in white adipogenesis and may have metabolic effects.

== Interactions ==
Bone morphogenetic protein 2 has been shown to interact with BMPR1A.

== Clinical use and complications ==
Bone morphogenetic protein 2 is shown to stimulate the production of bone. Recombinant human protein (rhBMP-2) is currently available for orthopaedic usage in the United States. Implantation of BMP-2 is performed using a variety of biomaterial carriers ("metals, ceramics, polymers, and composites") and delivery systems ("hydrogel, microsphere, nanoparticles, and fibers"). While used primarily in orthopedic procedures such as spinal fusion, BMP-2 has also found its way into the field of dentistry.

The use of dual tapered threaded fusion cages and recombinant human bone morphogenetic protein-2 on an absorbable collagen sponge obtained and maintained intervertebral spinal fusion, improved clinical outcomes, and reduced pain after anterior lumbar interbody arthrodesis in patients with degenerative lumbar disc disease. As an adjuvant to allograft bone or as a replacement for harvested autograft, bone morphogenetic proteins (BMPs) appear to improve fusion rates after spinal arthrodesis in both animal models and humans, while reducing the donor-site morbidity previously associated with such procedures.

A study published in 2011 noted "reports of frequent and occasionally catastrophic complications associated with use of [BMP-2] in spinal fusion surgeries", with a level of risk far in excess of estimates reported in earlier studies. An additional review by Agrawal and Sinha of BMP-2 and its common delivery systems in early 2016 showed how "problems like ectopic growth, lesser protein delivery, [and] inactivation of the protein" reveal a further need "to modify the available carrier systems as well as explore other biomaterials with desired properties."
