= TGF beta receptor 2 =

Protein-coding gene in the species Homo sapiens

TGFBR2
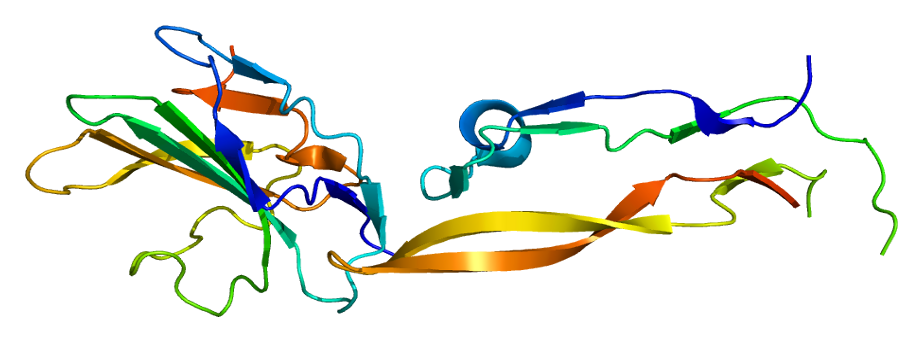

Identifiers
- Aliases: TGFBR2, AAT3, FAA3, LDS1B, LDS2, LDS2B, MFS2, RIIC, TAAD2, TGFR-2, TGFbeta-RII, transforming growth factor beta receptor 2, TBR-ii, TBRII
- External IDs: OMIM: 190182; MGI: 98729; GeneCards: TGFBR2
Available structures
| PDB | Ortholog search: PDBe RCSB |
| PDB | List of PDB id codes 1KTZ, 1M9Z, 1PLO, 2PJY, 3KFD, 4P7U, 4XJJ, 5E92, 5E91, 5E8V, 5E8Y |
Enzyme activity
| EC # | BRENDA | ExPASy | KEGG | MetaCyc |
|---|---|---|---|---|
| 2.7.11.30 | ↗ | ↗ | ↗ | ↗ |

Gene location (Human)
| Chr. | Chromosome 3 (human) |
| Band | 3p24.1 | Start | 30,606,601 bp |
| Band | 3p24.1 | End | 30,694,142 bp |

Gene location (Mouse)
| Chr. | Chromosome 9 (mouse) |
| Band | 9 F3|9 68.39 cM | Start | 115,913,361 bp |
| Band | 9 F3|9 68.39 cM | End | 116,004,428 bp |
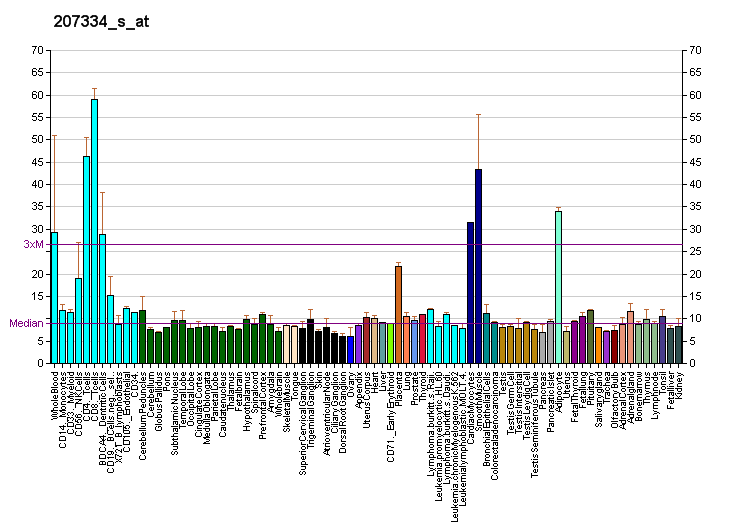

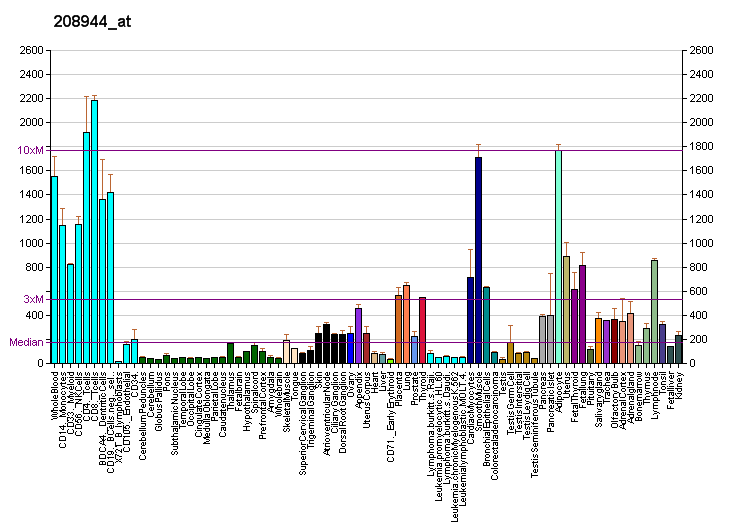
RNA expression pattern
| Bgee | Human / Mouse (ortholog); Top expressed in: pericardium; tibia; parietal pleura; epithelium of colon; lower lobe of lung; visceral pleura; vena cava; superficial temporal artery; cardiac muscle tissue of right atrium; synovial joint / Top expressed in: left lung lobe; gastrula; calvaria; decidua; lymph node; stroma of bone marrow; sciatic nerve; endothelial cell of lymphatic vessel; mesenteric lymph nodes; molar; More reference expression data |
| BioGPS | More reference expression data |
Gene ontology
| Molecular function | transforming growth factor beta-activated receptor activity; kinase activity; ATP binding; type III transforming growth factor beta receptor binding; protein kinase activity; transforming growth factor beta receptor activity, type II; metal ion binding; protein serine/threonine kinase activity; transferase activity; type I transforming growth factor beta receptor binding; mitogen-activated protein kinase kinase kinase binding; protein binding; SMAD binding; nucleotide binding; glycosaminoglycan binding; transforming growth factor beta binding; transmembrane receptor protein serine/threonine kinase activity; signaling receptor activity; growth factor binding |
| Cellular component | cytoplasm; cytosol; membrane; caveola; cell surface; membrane raft; integral component of membrane; receptor complex; plasma membrane; integral component of plasma membrane; external side of plasma membrane |
| Biological process | growth plate cartilage development; response to cholesterol; lens fiber cell apoptotic process; response to steroid hormone; positive regulation of T cell tolerance induction; receptor-mediated endocytosis; response to organic substance; vasculogenesis; protein phosphorylation; positive regulation of B cell tolerance induction; positive regulation of reactive oxygen species metabolic process; blood vessel development; positive regulation of mesenchymal cell proliferation; animal organ regeneration; animal organ morphogenesis; transforming growth factor beta receptor signaling pathway; embryo implantation; negative regulation of cell population proliferation; apoptotic process; pathway-restricted SMAD protein phosphorylation; common-partner SMAD protein phosphorylation; bronchus morphogenesis; lung development; response to mechanical stimulus; positive regulation of epithelial cell migration; in utero embryonic development; negative regulation of transforming growth factor beta receptor signaling pathway; development of the heart; cartilage development; positive regulation of tolerance induction to self antigen; branching involved in blood vessel morphogenesis; positive regulation of skeletal muscle tissue regeneration; smoothened signaling pathway; negative regulation of cardiac muscle cell proliferation; Notch signaling pathway; cell differentiation; phosphorylation; response to nutrient; mammary gland morphogenesis; wound healing; response to glucose; positive regulation of epithelial to mesenchymal transition; positive regulation of angiogenesis; response to estrogen; gastrulation; regulation of gene expression; embryonic cranial skeleton morphogenesis; peptidyl-threonine phosphorylation; trachea formation; lung lobe morphogenesis; positive regulation of smooth muscle cell proliferation; lung morphogenesis; response to organic cyclic compound; trachea morphogenesis; ageing; myeloid dendritic cell differentiation; bronchus development; brain development; transmembrane receptor protein serine/threonine kinase signaling pathway; lens development in camera-type eye; regulation of cell population proliferation; peptidyl-serine phosphorylation; positive regulation of cell population proliferation; embryonic hemopoiesis; growth plate cartilage chondrocyte growth; regulation of growth; positive regulation of NK T cell differentiation; digestive tract development; activation of protein kinase activity; response to hypoxia; heart looping; outflow tract septum morphogenesis; membranous septum morphogenesis; outflow tract morphogenesis; atrioventricular valve morphogenesis; tricuspid valve morphogenesis; cardiac left ventricle morphogenesis; endocardial cushion fusion; ventricular septum morphogenesis; positive regulation of epithelial to mesenchymal transition involved in endocardial cushion formation; cell proliferation involved in endocardial cushion morphogenesis; positive regulation of CD4-positive, alpha-beta T cell proliferation; superior endocardial cushion morphogenesis; inferior endocardial cushion morphogenesis; miRNA transport; secondary palate development; pattern specification process |
Sources:Amigo / QuickGO
Orthologs
| Databases | NCBI: entry; OMA: entry |
| Species | Human | Mouse |
| Entrez | 7048 | 21813 |
| Ensembl | ENSG00000163513 | ENSMUSG00000032440 |
| UniProt | P37173 | Q62312 |
| RefSeq (mRNA) | NM_001024847; NM_003242 | NM_009371; NM_029575 |
| RefSeq (protein) | NP_001020018; NP_003233 | NP_033397; NP_083851 |
| Location (UCSC) | Chr 3: 30.61 – 30.69 Mb | Chr 9: 115.91 – 116 Mb |
| PubMed search |
- Wikidata
| View/Edit Human | View/Edit Mouse |

Transforming growth factor, beta receptor II (70/80kDa) is a TGF beta receptor. TGFBR2 is its human gene.

It is a tumor suppressor gene.

== Function ==
This gene encodes a member of the serine/threonine protein kinase family and the TGFB receptor subfamily. The encoded protein is a transmembrane protein that has a protein kinase domain, forms a heterodimeric complex with another receptor protein, and binds TGF-beta. This receptor/ligand complex phosphorylates proteins, which then enter the nucleus and regulate the transcription of a subset of genes related to cell proliferation. Mutations in this gene have been associated with Marfan syndrome, Loeys-Deitz aortic aneurysm syndrome, Osler–Weber–Rendu syndrome, and the development of various types of tumors. At least 73 disease-causing mutations in this gene have been discovered. Alternatively spliced transcript variants encoding different isoforms have been characterized.

== Interactions ==
TGF beta receptor 2 has been shown to interact with:

- AP2B1,
- Cyclin B2,
- Endoglin,
- Heat shock protein 90kDa alpha (cytosolic), member A1
- STRAP,
- TGF beta receptor 1, and
- Transforming growth factor, beta 3.

== Domain architecture ==
Transforming growth factor beta receptor 2 ectodomain
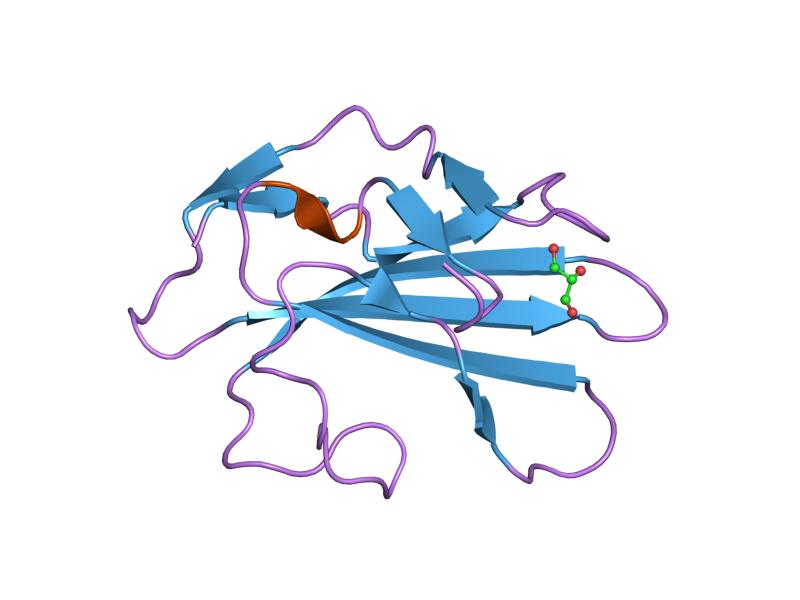
- crystal structure of human tgf-beta type ii receptor ligand binding domain

Identifiers
- Symbol: ecTbetaR2
- Pfam: PF08917
- InterPro: IPR015013
Available protein structures:
- PDB: IPR015013 PF08917 (ECOD; PDBsum)
- AlphaFold: IPR015013; PF08917

TGF beta receptor 2 consists of a C-terminal protein kinase domain and an N-terminal ectodomain. The ectodomain consists of a compact fold containing nine beta-strands and a single helix stabilised by a network of six intra strand disulphide bonds. The folding topology includes a central five-stranded antiparallel beta-sheet, eight-residues long at its centre, covered by a second layer consisting of two segments of two-stranded antiparallel beta-sheets (beta1-beta4, beta3-beta9).

== See also ==
- TGF beta receptors
