= BMPR1A =

Bone morphogenetic protein receptor

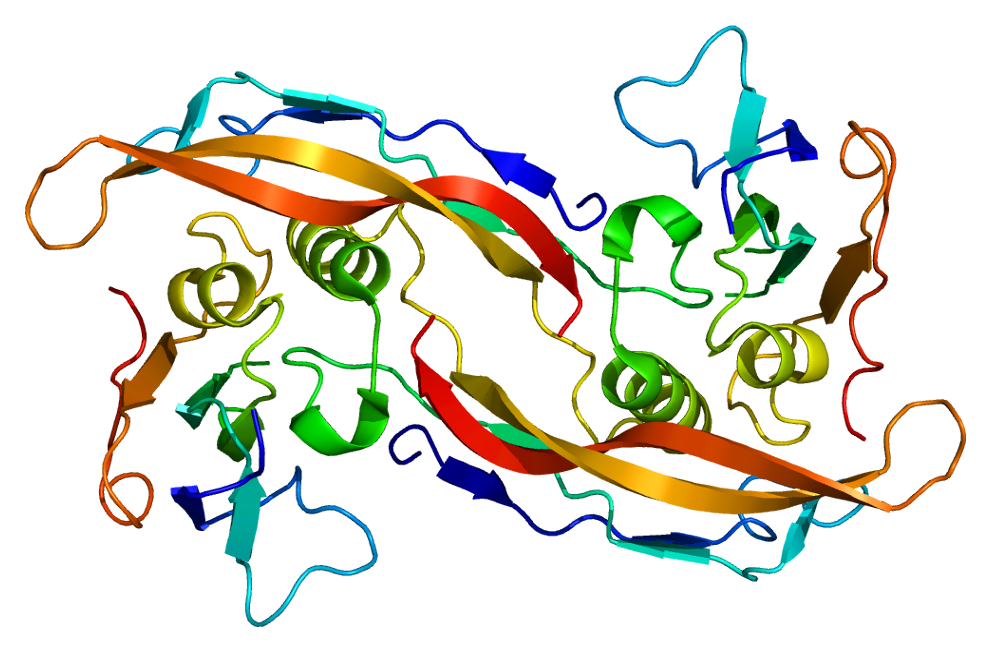

Identifiers
- Aliases: BMPR1A, 10q23del, ACVRLK3, ALK3, CD292, SKR5, bone morphogenetic protein receptor type 1A
- External IDs: OMIM: 601299; MGI: 1338938; GeneCards: BMPR1A
Available structures
| PDB | Ortholog search: PDBe RCSB |
| PDB | List of PDB id codes 3QB4, 1ES7, 1REW, 2GOO, 2H62, 2H64, 2K3G, 2QJ9, 2QJA, 2QJB, 3NH7 |
Enzyme activity
| EC # | BRENDA | ExPASy | KEGG | MetaCyc |
|---|---|---|---|---|
| 2.7.11.30 | ↗ | ↗ | ↗ | ↗ |

Gene location (Human)
| Chr. | Chromosome 10 (human) |
| Band | 10q23.2 | Start | 86,756,601 bp |
| Band | 10q23.2 | End | 86,932,825 bp |

Gene location (Mouse)
| Chr. | Chromosome 14 (mouse) |
| Band | 14 B|14 20.81 cM | Start | 34,132,691 bp |
| Band | 14 B|14 20.81 cM | End | 34,225,298 bp |
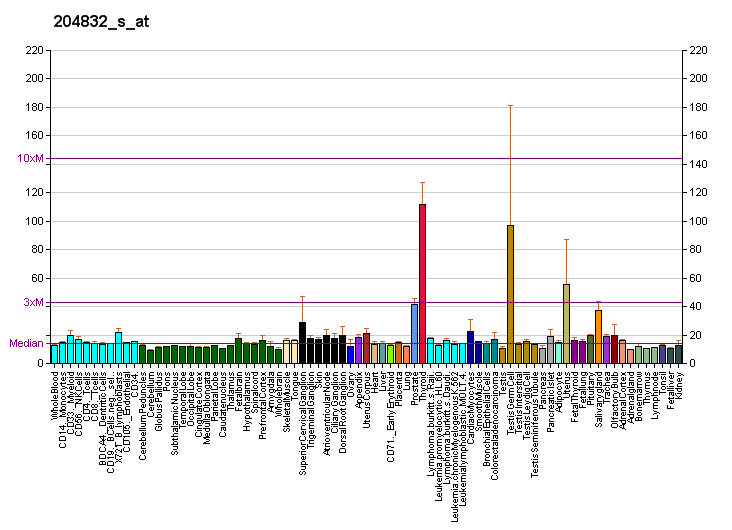

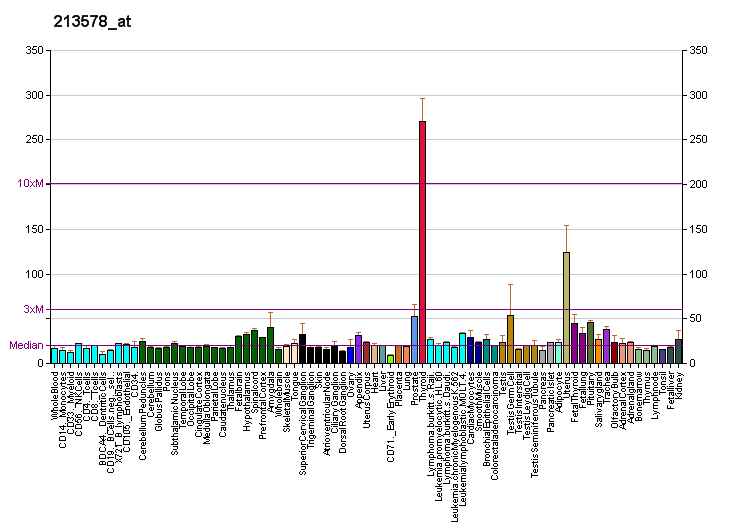
RNA expression pattern
| Bgee | Human / Mouse (ortholog); Top expressed in: secondary oocyte; Achilles tendon; saphenous vein; parotid gland; tail of epididymis; biceps brachii; seminal vesicula; popliteal artery; tibial arteries; urethra / Top expressed in: ascending aorta; aortic valve; vas deferens; vestibular sensory epithelium; efferent ductule; genital tubercle; calvaria; epithelium of lens; iris; vestibular membrane of cochlear duct; More reference expression data |
| BioGPS | More reference expression data |
Gene ontology
| Molecular function | transferase activity; nucleotide binding; protein kinase activity; protein homodimerization activity; metal ion binding; kinase activity; protein serine/threonine kinase activity; transmembrane receptor protein serine/threonine kinase activity; protein binding; DNA-binding transcription factor activity, RNA polymerase II-specific; SMAD binding; ATP binding; BMP receptor activity; transforming growth factor beta-activated receptor activity; transforming growth factor beta receptor activity, type I; growth factor binding |
| Cellular component | integral component of membrane; HFE-transferrin receptor complex; membrane; plasma membrane; soma; dendrite; caveola; external side of plasma membrane; integral component of plasma membrane; receptor complex; cell surface |
| Biological process | somitogenesis; pattern specification process; roof of mouth development; cell differentiation; pituitary gland development; endoderm development; chondrocyte differentiation; neural crest cell development; lateral mesoderm development; lung development; positive regulation of bone mineralization; embryonic organ development; paraxial mesoderm structural organization; positive regulation of epithelial cell proliferation; phosphorylation; negative regulation of neurogenesis; positive regulation of pathway-restricted SMAD protein phosphorylation; mesoderm formation; ectoderm development; embryonic digit morphogenesis; heart morphogenesis; cellular response to BMP stimulus; in utero embryonic development; BMP signaling pathway; hindlimb morphogenesis; nervous system development; dorsal/ventral axis specification; regulation of lateral mesodermal cell fate specification; stem cell population maintenance; odontogenesis of dentin-containing tooth; Mullerian duct regression; endocardial cushion formation; protein phosphorylation; positive regulation of transcription, DNA-templated; development of the heart; cartilage development; positive regulation of osteoblast differentiation; developmental growth; transmembrane receptor protein serine/threonine kinase signaling pathway; positive regulation of mesenchymal cell proliferation; heart formation; neural plate pattern specification; embryonic morphogenesis; mesendoderm development; immune response; regulation of cellular senescence; neural plate mediolateral regionalization; dorsal/ventral pattern formation; transforming growth factor beta receptor signaling pathway; positive regulation of SMAD protein signal transduction; anterior/posterior pattern specification; paraxial mesoderm development; positive regulation of pri-miRNA transcription by RNA polymerase II; negative regulation of smooth muscle cell migration; BMP signaling pathway involved in heart development; regulation of cardiac muscle cell apoptotic process; outflow tract septum morphogenesis; outflow tract morphogenesis; cardiac conduction system development; mitral valve morphogenesis; tricuspid valve morphogenesis; endocardial cushion morphogenesis; cardiac right ventricle morphogenesis; ventricular trabecula myocardium morphogenesis; ventricular compact myocardium morphogenesis; dorsal aorta morphogenesis; positive regulation of transcription by RNA polymerase II; regulation of cardiac muscle cell proliferation; positive regulation of cardiac muscle cell proliferation; pharyngeal arch artery morphogenesis; positive regulation of cardiac ventricle development; positive regulation of vascular associated smooth muscle cell proliferation; fibrous ring of heart morphogenesis; regulation of neural crest cell differentiation |
Sources:Amigo / QuickGO
Orthologs
| Databases | NCBI: entry; OMA: entry |
| Species | Human | Mouse |
| Entrez | 657 | 12166 |
| Ensembl | ENSG00000107779 | ENSMUSG00000021796 |
| UniProt | P36894 | P36895 |
| RefSeq (mRNA) | NM_004329 | NM_009758 |
| RefSeq (protein) | NP_004320 | NP_033888 |
| Location (UCSC) | Chr 10: 86.76 – 86.93 Mb | Chr 14: 34.13 – 34.23 Mb |
| PubMed search |
- Wikidata
| View/Edit Human | View/Edit Mouse |

The bone morphogenetic protein receptor, type IA also known as BMPR1A is a protein which in humans is encoded by the BMPR1A gene. BMPR1A has also been designated as CD292 (cluster of differentiation 292).

== Function ==
The bone morphogenetic protein (BMP) receptors are a family of transmembrane serine/threonine kinases that include the type I receptors BMPR1A (this protein) and BMPR1B and the type II receptor BMPR2. These receptors are also closely related to the activin receptors, ACVR1 and ACVR2. The ligands of these receptors are members of the TGF beta superfamily. TGF-betas and activins transduce their signals through the formation of heterodimeric complexes with 2 different types of serine (threonine) kinase receptors: type I receptors of about 50-55 kD and type II receptors of about 70-80 kD. Type II receptors bind ligands in the absence of type I receptors, but they require their respective type I receptors for signaling, whereas type I receptors require their respective type II receptors for ligand binding.

BMP's repress WNT signaling to maintain stable stem cell populations. BMPR1A null mice died at embryonic day 8.0 without mesoderm specification, demonstrating its vital role in gastrulation. It has been demonstrated in experiments using dominant negative BMPR1A chick embryos that BMPR1A plays a role in apoptosis and adipocyte development. Using constitutively active forms of BMPR1A, it has been shown that BMPR1A plays a role in cell differentiation. Signals transduced by the BMPR1A receptor are not essential for osteoblast formation or proliferation; however, BMPR1A is necessary for the extracellular matrix deposition by osteoblasts. In the chick embryo, BMPR1A receptors are found in low levels in limb bud mesenchyme, a differing location to BMPR1B, supporting the differing roles they play in osteogenesis.

== Ligands ==
- Agonists: BMP2, BMP4, BMP6, BMP7, GDF6
- Antagonists: Noggin, Chordin

== Diseases ==
BMPR1A, SMAD4 and PTEN are responsible for juvenile polyposis syndrome, juvenile intestinal polyposis and Cowden's disease.

== Interactions ==
BMPR1A has been shown to interact with:

- BMP2,
- SF3B4, and
- ZMYND11.
