= ACVR1 =

Protein-coding gene

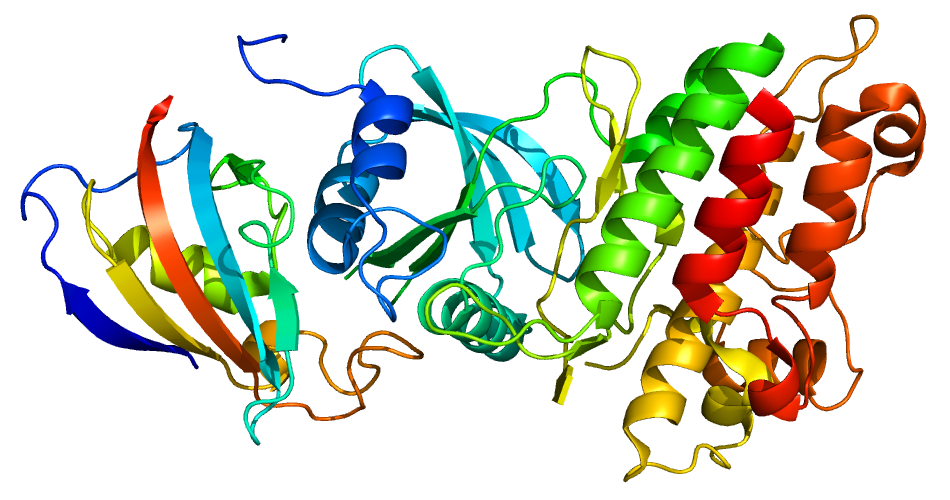
- ACVR1 (right) in complex with FKBP12 (left)

Identifiers
- Aliases: ACVR1, ACTRI, ACVR1A, ACVRLK2, ALK2, FOP, SKR1, TSRI, activin A receptor type 1
- External IDs: OMIM: 102576; MGI: 87911; GeneCards: ACVR1
Available structures
PDB	Ortholog search: PDBe RCSB
PDB	List of PDB id codes 3H9R, 3MTF, 3OOM, 3Q4U, 4BGG, 4C02, 4DYM
Enzyme activity
EC #	BRENDA	ExPASy	KEGG	MetaCyc
2.7.11.30	↗	↗	↗	↗

Gene location (Human)
Chr.	Chromosome 2 (human)
Band	2q24.1	Start	157,736,251 bp
Band	2q24.1	End	157,876,330 bp

Gene location (Mouse)
Chr.	Chromosome 2 (mouse)
Band	2|2 C1.1	Start	58,278,656 bp
Band	2|2 C1.1	End	58,457,169 bp
RNA expression pattern
Bgee	Human / Mouse (ortholog); Top expressed in: cartilage tissue; synovial joint; saphenous vein; stromal cell of endometrium; urethra; islet of Langerhans; secondary oocyte; periodontal fiber; ventricular zone; synovial membrane / Top expressed in: atrioventricular valve; endocardial cushion; calvaria; vas deferens; atrium; ureter; dermis; semi-lunar valve; ankle; vestibular membrane of cochlear duct; More reference expression data
BioGPS	n/a
Gene ontology
Molecular function	transferase activity; protein kinase activity; activin receptor activity, type I; nucleotide binding; protein homodimerization activity; growth factor binding; activin binding; metal ion binding; kinase activity; peptide hormone binding; protein serine/threonine kinase activity; transmembrane receptor protein serine/threonine kinase activity; transforming growth factor beta receptor activity, type I; protein binding; ATP binding; transforming growth factor beta binding; SMAD binding; transforming growth factor beta-activated receptor activity; BMP receptor activity
Cellular component	integral component of membrane; membrane; apical part of cell; integral component of plasma membrane; activin receptor complex; receptor complex
Biological process	germ cell development; pathway-restricted SMAD protein phosphorylation; positive regulation of bone mineralization; phosphorylation; positive regulation of cell migration; mesoderm formation; gastrulation with mouth forming second; negative regulation of extrinsic apoptotic signaling pathway; endocardial cushion cell fate commitment; cellular response to BMP stimulus; in utero embryonic development; positive regulation of determination of dorsal identity; mitral valve morphogenesis; smooth muscle cell differentiation; BMP signaling pathway; positive regulation of transcription, DNA-templated; protein phosphorylation; negative regulation of activin receptor signaling pathway; development of the heart; determination of left/right symmetry; positive regulation of osteoblast differentiation; transmembrane receptor protein serine/threonine kinase signaling pathway; acute inflammatory response; gastrulation; embryonic heart tube morphogenesis; neural crest cell migration; cardiac muscle cell fate commitment; branching involved in blood vessel morphogenesis; negative regulation of signal transduction; regulation of ossification; peptidyl-threonine phosphorylation; mesoderm development; transforming growth factor beta receptor signaling pathway; pharyngeal system development; activin receptor signaling pathway; outflow tract septum morphogenesis; atrioventricular valve morphogenesis; endocardial cushion morphogenesis; endocardial cushion fusion; atrial septum primum morphogenesis; positive regulation of pathway-restricted SMAD protein phosphorylation; positive regulation of transcription by RNA polymerase II; ventricular septum morphogenesis; BMP signaling pathway involved in heart development; positive regulation of epithelial to mesenchymal transition involved in endocardial cushion formation; G1/S transition of mitotic cell cycle; pattern specification process
Sources:Amigo / QuickGO
Orthologs
Databases	NCBI: entry; OMA: entry
Species	Human	Mouse
Entrez	90	11477
Ensembl	ENSG00000115170	ENSMUSG00000026836
UniProt	Q04771	P37172
RefSeq (mRNA)	NM_001105; NM_001111067; NM_001347663; NM_001347664; NM_001347665 NM_001347666; NM_001347667	NM_001110204; NM_001110205; NM_007394; NM_001355048; NM_001355049
RefSeq (protein)	NP_001096; NP_001104537; NP_001334592; NP_001334593; NP_001334594 NP_001334595; NP_001334596	NP_001103674; NP_001103675; NP_031420; NP_001341977; NP_001341978
Location (UCSC)	Chr 2: 157.74 – 157.88 Mb	Chr 2: 58.28 – 58.46 Mb
PubMed search
- Wikidata
View/Edit Human	View/Edit Mouse

Activin A receptor, type I (ACVR1) is a protein; in humans it is encoded by the ACVR1 gene; it is also known as ALK-2 (activin receptor-like kinase-2). ACVR1 has been linked to the 2q23-24 region of the genome. This protein is important in the bone morphogenic protein (BMP) pathway that is responsible for the development and repair of the skeletal system. While knockout models with this gene are in progress, the ACVR1 gene has been connected to fibrodysplasia ossificans progressiva, an extremely rare progressive genetic disease characterized by heterotopic ossification of muscles, tendons, and ligaments. It is a bone morphogenetic protein receptor, type 1.

== Function ==
Activins are dimeric growth and differentiation factors that belong to the transforming growth factor-beta (TGF beta) superfamily of structurally related signaling proteins. Activins signal through a heteromeric complex of receptor serine kinases that include at least two type I ( I and IB) and two type II (II and IIB) receptors. These receptors are all transmembrane proteins, composed of a ligand-binding extracellular domain with cysteine-rich region, a transmembrane domain, and a cytoplasmic domain with predicted serine/threonine specificity. Type I receptors are essential for signaling; type II receptors are required for binding ligands and for expression of type I receptors. Type I and II receptors form a stable complex after ligand binding, resulting in phosphorylation of type I receptors by type II receptors. This gene encodes activin A type I receptor that signals a particular transcriptional response in concert with activin type II receptors.

== Signaling ==
ACVR1 transduces signals of BMPs. BMPs bind either ACVR2A/ACVR2B or a BMPR2 and then form a complex with ACVR1. These go on to recruit the R-SMADs SMAD1, SMAD2, SMAD3 or SMAD6.

== Clinical significance ==
Gain-of-function mutations in the gene ACVR1/ALK2 is responsible for the genetic disease fibrodysplasia ossificans progressiva (FOP). The typical FOP patient has the amino acid histidine substituted for the amino acid arginine at position 206 in this protein. This substitution causes a change in the critical glycine-serine activation domain of the protein that will then cause the protein to bind its inhibitory ligand (FKBP12) less tightly, and thus overactivate the BMP/SMAD pathway. The result of this overactivation is that endothelial cells transform to mesenchymal stem cells and then to bone. Atypical mutations involving other residues work similarly, thereby causing the protein to be stuck in its active conformation despite no BMP being present.

Mutations in the ACVR1 gene have also been linked to cancer, especially diffuse intrinsic pontine glioma (DIPG).
