= INHBA =

Protein-coding gene in the species Homo sapiens

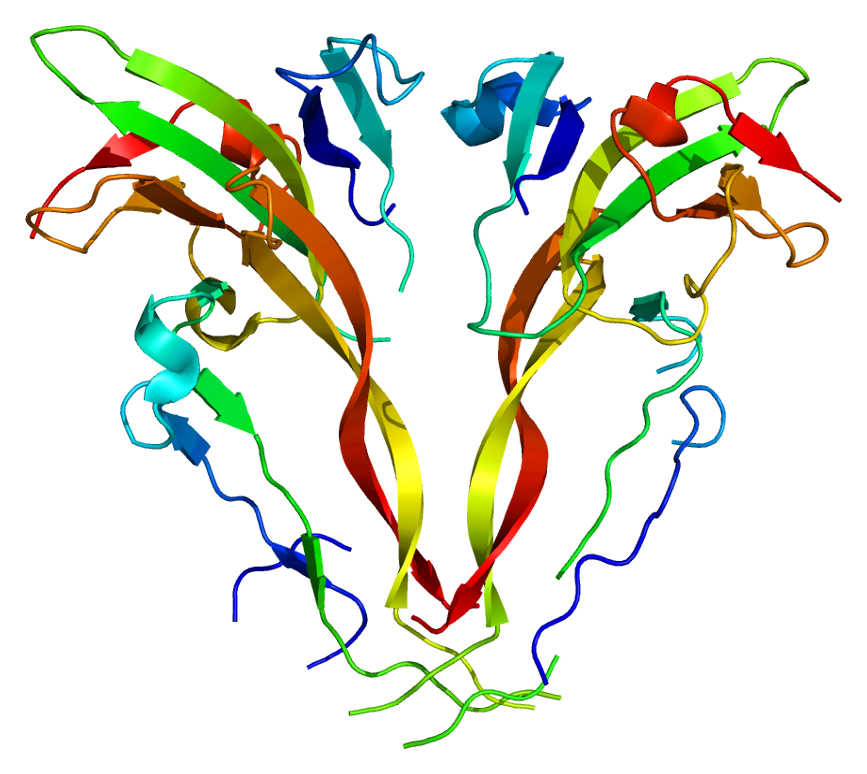

Identifiers
- Aliases: INHBA, EDF, FRP, inhibin beta A, inhibin beta A subunit, inhibin subunit beta A
- External IDs: OMIM: 147290; MGI: 96570; GeneCards: INHBA
Available structures
PDB	Ortholog search: PDBe RCSB
PDB	List of PDB id codes 1NYS, 1NYU, 1S4Y, 2ARP, 2ARV, 2B0U, 2P6A, 3B4V, 4MID, 5HLY, 5HLZ

Gene location (Human)
Chr.	Chromosome 7 (human)
Band	7p14.1	Start	41,667,168 bp
Band	7p14.1	End	41,705,834 bp

Gene location (Mouse)
Chr.	Chromosome 13 (mouse)
Band	13 A1|13 5.85 cM	Start	16,186,436 bp
Band	13 A1|13 5.85 cM	End	16,206,206 bp
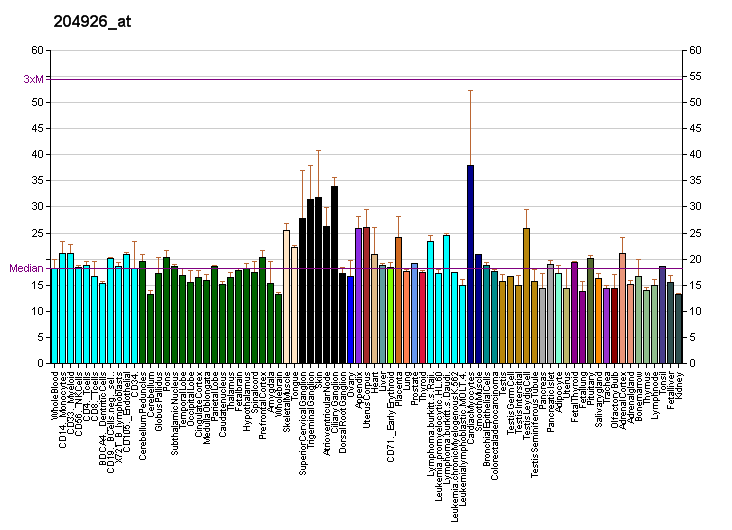

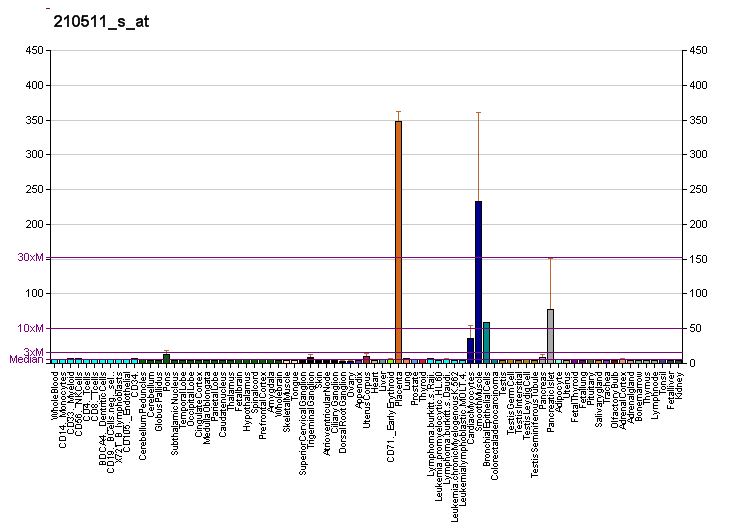
RNA expression pattern
Bgee	Human / Mouse (ortholog); Top expressed in: cartilage tissue; saphenous vein; vena cava; visceral pleura; stromal cell of endometrium; buccal mucosa cell; beta cell; placenta; caput epididymis; lower lobe of lung / Top expressed in: cumulus cell; epithelium of lens; incisor; nasopharynx; ascending aorta; dental follicle; rib; efferent ductule; aortic valve; barrel cortex; More reference expression data
BioGPS	More reference expression data
Gene ontology
Molecular function	transforming growth factor beta receptor binding; signaling receptor binding; hormone activity; identical protein binding; growth factor activity; cytokine activity; protein heterodimerization activity; type II activin receptor binding; peptide hormone binding; protein binding; inhibin binding
Cellular component	inhibin A complex; activin A complex; perinuclear region of cytoplasm; extracellular region; extracellular space
Biological process	negative regulation of cell population proliferation; eyelid development in camera-type eye; endodermal cell differentiation; negative regulation of follicle-stimulating hormone secretion; GABAergic neuron differentiation; cell-cell signaling; progesterone secretion; mesodermal cell differentiation; negative regulation of macrophage differentiation; odontogenesis; hair follicle development; hematopoietic progenitor cell differentiation; regulation of transcription by RNA polymerase II; negative regulation of phosphorylation; SMAD protein signal transduction; extrinsic apoptotic signaling pathway; positive regulation of follicle-stimulating hormone secretion; cell surface receptor signaling pathway; positive regulation of pathway-restricted SMAD protein phosphorylation; nervous system development; positive regulation of ovulation; positive regulation of gene expression; positive regulation of extrinsic apoptotic signaling pathway in absence of ligand; cellular response to cholesterol; mesoderm formation; activin receptor signaling pathway; negative regulation of B cell differentiation; ovarian follicle development; striatal medium spiny neuron differentiation; positive regulation of protein metabolic process; positive regulation of transcription, DNA-templated; hemoglobin biosynthetic process; roof of mouth development; positive regulation of erythrocyte differentiation; cellular response to follicle-stimulating hormone stimulus; regulation of MAPK cascade; cell development; positive regulation of transcription by RNA polymerase II; negative regulation of cell cycle; negative regulation of cell growth; cell differentiation; defense response; erythrocyte differentiation; male gonad development; regulation of follicle-stimulating hormone secretion; regulation of signaling receptor activity; G1/S transition of mitotic cell cycle; response to wounding; regulation of apoptotic process; negative regulation of hair follicle development; signal transduction
Sources:Amigo / QuickGO
Orthologs
Databases	NCBI: entry; OMA: entry
Species	Human	Mouse
Entrez	3624	16323
Ensembl	ENSG00000122641	ENSMUSG00000041324
UniProt	P08476	Q04998
RefSeq (mRNA)	NM_002192	NM_008380
RefSeq (protein)	NP_002183; NP_002183.1	NP_032406
Location (UCSC)	Chr 7: 41.67 – 41.71 Mb	Chr 13: 16.19 – 16.21 Mb
PubMed search
- Wikidata
View/Edit Human	View/Edit Mouse

Inhibin, beta A, also known as INHBA, is a protein which in humans is encoded by the INHBA gene. INHBA is a subunit of both activin and inhibin, two closely related glycoproteins with opposing biological effects.

== Function ==
The inhibin beta A subunit joins the alpha subunit to form a pituitary FSH secretion inhibitor. Inhibin has been shown to regulate gonadal stromal cell proliferation negatively and to have tumor-suppressor activity. In addition, serum levels of inhibin have been shown to reflect the size of granulosa-cell tumors and can therefore be used as a marker for primary as well as recurrent disease. Because expression in gonadal and various extragonadal tissues may vary several fold in a tissue-specific fashion, it is proposed that inhibin may be both a growth/differentiation factor and a hormone. Furthermore, the beta A subunit forms a homodimer, activin A, and also joins with a beta B subunit to form a heterodimer, activin AB, both of which stimulate FSH secretion. Finally, it has been shown that the beta A subunit mRNA is identical to the erythroid differentiation factor subunit mRNA and that only one gene for this mRNA exists in the human genome.

== Interactions ==
INHBA has been shown to interact with ACVR2A.
