= ACVR1C =

Protein found in humans

Identifiers
- Aliases: ACVR1C, ACVRLK7, ALK7, activin A receptor type 1C
- External IDs: OMIM: 608981; MGI: 2661081; GeneCards: ACVR1C
Enzyme activity
EC #	BRENDA	ExPASy	KEGG	MetaCyc
2.7.11.30	↗	↗	↗	↗

Gene location (Human)
Chr.	Chromosome 2 (human)
Band	2q24.1	Start	157,526,767 bp
Band	2q24.1	End	157,628,864 bp

Gene location (Mouse)
Chr.	Chromosome 2 (mouse)
Band	2|2 C1.1	Start	58,157,465 bp
Band	2|2 C1.1	End	58,247,907 bp
RNA expression pattern
Bgee	Human / Mouse (ortholog); Top expressed in: jejunal mucosa; adipose tissue; secondary oocyte; endothelial cell; islet of Langerhans; subcutaneous adipose tissue; testicle; buccal mucosa cell; lactiferous gland; abdominal fat / Top expressed in: brown adipose tissue; white adipose tissue; intercostal muscle; subcutaneous adipose tissue; Paneth cell; dorsal striatum; lumbar subsegment of spinal cord; substantia nigra; mammary gland; nucleus accumbens; More reference expression data
BioGPS	n/a
Gene ontology
Molecular function	transferase activity; activin receptor activity, type I; nucleotide binding; protein kinase activity; growth factor binding; metal ion binding; kinase activity; transmembrane receptor protein serine/threonine kinase activity; nodal binding; ATP binding; protein serine/threonine kinase activity; transforming growth factor beta-activated receptor activity; transforming growth factor beta receptor activity, type I; SMAD binding; activin binding
Cellular component	integral component of membrane; membrane; plasma membrane; activin receptor complex; integral component of plasma membrane; receptor complex
Biological process	response to dietary excess; cell differentiation; negative regulation of insulin secretion; phosphorylation; lipid storage; response to glucose; negative regulation of trophoblast cell migration; nodal signaling pathway; response to insulin; protein phosphorylation; positive regulation of cysteine-type endopeptidase activity involved in apoptotic process; transmembrane receptor protein serine/threonine kinase signaling pathway; apoptotic nuclear changes; negative regulation of chorionic trophoblast cell proliferation; apoptotic process; transforming growth factor beta receptor signaling pathway; pattern specification process; activin receptor signaling pathway
Sources:Amigo / QuickGO
Orthologs
Databases	NCBI: entry; OMA: entry
Species	Human	Mouse
Entrez	130399	269275
Ensembl	ENSG00000123612	ENSMUSG00000026834
UniProt	Q8NER5	Q8K348
RefSeq (mRNA)	NM_145259; NM_001111031; NM_001111032; NM_001111033	NM_001033369; NM_001111030
RefSeq (protein)	NP_001104501; NP_001104502; NP_001104503; NP_660302	NP_001028541; NP_001104500
Location (UCSC)	Chr 2: 157.53 – 157.63 Mb	Chr 2: 58.16 – 58.25 Mb
PubMed search
- Wikidata
View/Edit Human	View/Edit Mouse

The activin A receptor also known as ACVR1C or ALK-7 is a protein that in humans is encoded by the ACVR1C gene. ACVR1C is a type I receptor for the TGFB family of signaling molecules.

ACVR1C transduces signals of Nodal. Nodal binds to ACVR2B and then forms a complex with ACVR1C. These go on to recruit the R-SMADs SMAD2 or SMAD3.

Upon ligand binding, type I receptors phosphorylate cytoplasmic SMAD family transcription factors, which then translocate to the nucleus and interact directly with DNA or in complex with other transcription factors.
