= ACVR1B =

Protein-coding gene in humans

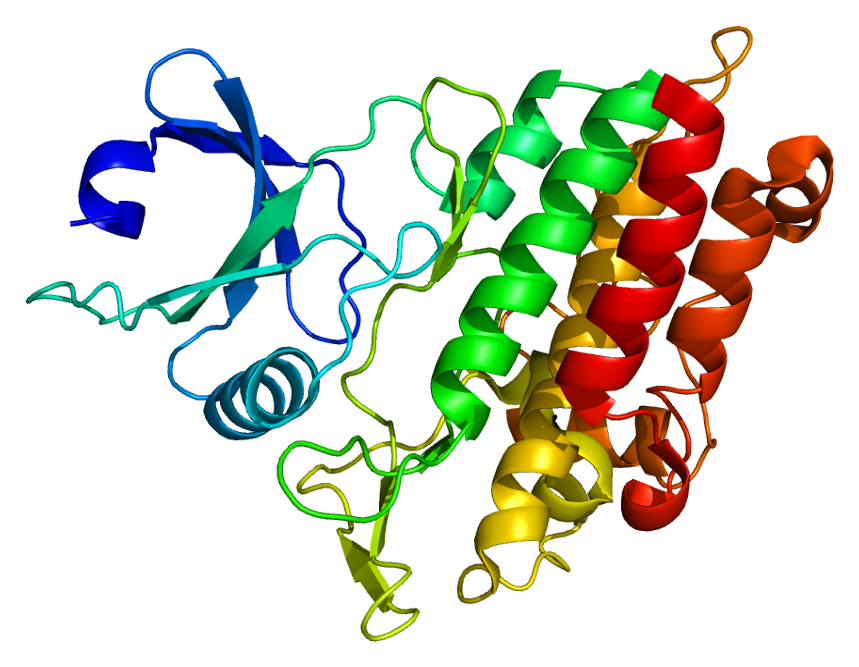

Identifiers
- Aliases: ACVR1B, ACTRIB, ACVRLK4, ALK4, SKR2, activin A receptor type 1B
- External IDs: OMIM: 601300; MGI: 1338944; GeneCards: ACVR1B
Available structures
PDB	Ortholog search: PDBe RCSB
PDB	List of PDB id codes 3H9R, 3MTF, 3OOM, 3Q4U, 4BGG, 4C02, 4DYM
Enzyme activity
EC #	BRENDA	ExPASy	KEGG	MetaCyc
2.7.11.30	↗	↗	↗	↗

Gene location (Human)
Chr.	Chromosome 12 (human)
Band	12q13.13	Start	51,951,699 bp
Band	12q13.13	End	51,997,078 bp

Gene location (Mouse)
Chr.	Chromosome 15 (mouse)
Band	15 F1|15 56.48 cM	Start	101,071,948 bp
Band	15 F1|15 56.48 cM	End	101,111,565 bp
RNA expression pattern
Bgee	Human / Mouse (ortholog); Top expressed in: secondary oocyte; middle temporal gyrus; pancreatic ductal cell; renal medulla; Brodmann area 23; beta cell; lateral nuclear group of thalamus; parotid gland; kidney tubule; Brodmann area 10 / Top expressed in: transitional epithelium of urinary bladder; epithelium of stomach; hair follicle; skin of external ear; olfactory tubercle; prefrontal cortex; Paneth cell; nucleus accumbens; ventromedial nucleus; Rostral migratory stream; More reference expression data
BioGPS	n/a
Gene ontology
Molecular function	transferase activity; nucleotide binding; protein kinase activity; growth factor binding; activin binding; metal ion binding; kinase activity; transmembrane receptor protein serine/threonine kinase activity; inhibin binding; protein binding; activin-activated receptor activity; ATP binding; ubiquitin protein ligase binding; protein serine/threonine kinase activity; activin receptor activity, type I; SMAD binding; transforming growth factor beta-activated receptor activity; transforming growth factor beta receptor activity, type I
Cellular component	integral component of membrane; membrane; receptor complex; plasma membrane; integral component of plasma membrane; activin receptor complex; cell surface; cytosol
Biological process	hair follicle development; regulation of transcription, DNA-templated; positive regulation of erythrocyte differentiation; extrinsic apoptotic signaling pathway; phosphorylation; positive regulation of pathway-restricted SMAD protein phosphorylation; in utero embryonic development; negative regulation of gene expression; nodal signaling pathway; positive regulation of trophoblast cell migration; protein phosphorylation; central nervous system development; development of primary female sexual characteristics; positive regulation of gene expression; transmembrane receptor protein serine/threonine kinase signaling pathway; positive regulation of activin receptor signaling pathway; regulation of signal transduction; negative regulation of cell growth; protein autophosphorylation; peptidyl-threonine phosphorylation; signal transduction; positive regulation of transcription by RNA polymerase II; activin receptor signaling pathway; G1/S transition of mitotic cell cycle; transforming growth factor beta receptor signaling pathway; pattern specification process
Sources:Amigo / QuickGO
Orthologs
Databases	NCBI: entry; OMA: entry
Species	Human	Mouse
Entrez	91	11479
Ensembl	ENSG00000135503	ENSMUSG00000000532
UniProt	P36896	Q61271
RefSeq (mRNA)	NM_004302; NM_020327; NM_020328	NM_007395
RefSeq (protein)	NP_004293; NP_064732; NP_064733	NP_031421
Location (UCSC)	Chr 12: 51.95 – 52 Mb	Chr 15: 101.07 – 101.11 Mb
PubMed search
- Wikidata
View/Edit Human	View/Edit Mouse

Activin receptor type-1B is a protein that in humans is encoded by the ACVR1B gene.

ACVR1B or ALK-4 acts as a transducer of activin or activin-like ligands (e.g., inhibin) signals. Activin binds to either ACVR2A or ACVR2B and then forms a complex with ACVR1B. These go on to recruit the R-SMADs SMAD2 or SMAD3. ACVR1B also transduces signals of nodal, GDF-1, and Vg1; however, unlike activin, they require other coreceptor molecules such as the protein Cripto.

== Function ==
Activins are dimeric growth and differentiation factors which belong to the transforming growth factor-beta (TGF-beta) superfamily of structurally related signaling proteins. Activins signal through a heteromeric complex of receptor serine kinases which include at least two type I (I and IB) and two type II (II and IIB) receptors. These receptors are all transmembrane proteins, composed of a ligand-binding extracellular domain with a cysteine-rich region, a transmembrane domain, and a cytoplasmic domain with predicted serine/threonine specificity. Type I receptors are essential for signaling, and type II receptors are required for binding ligands and expression of type I receptors. Type I and II receptors form a stable complex after ligand binding, resulting in phosphorylation of type I receptors by type II receptors. This gene encodes activin A type IB receptor, composed of 11 exons. Alternative splicing and alternative polyadenylation result in 3 fully described transcript variants. The mRNA expression of variants 1, 2, and 3 is confirmed, and a potential fourth variant contains an alternative exon 8 and lacks exons 9 through 11, but its mRNA expression has not been confirmed.

== Interactions ==
ACVR1B has been shown to interact with

- ACVR2A, and ACVR2B
