= ACVR2B =

Protein-coding gene in humans

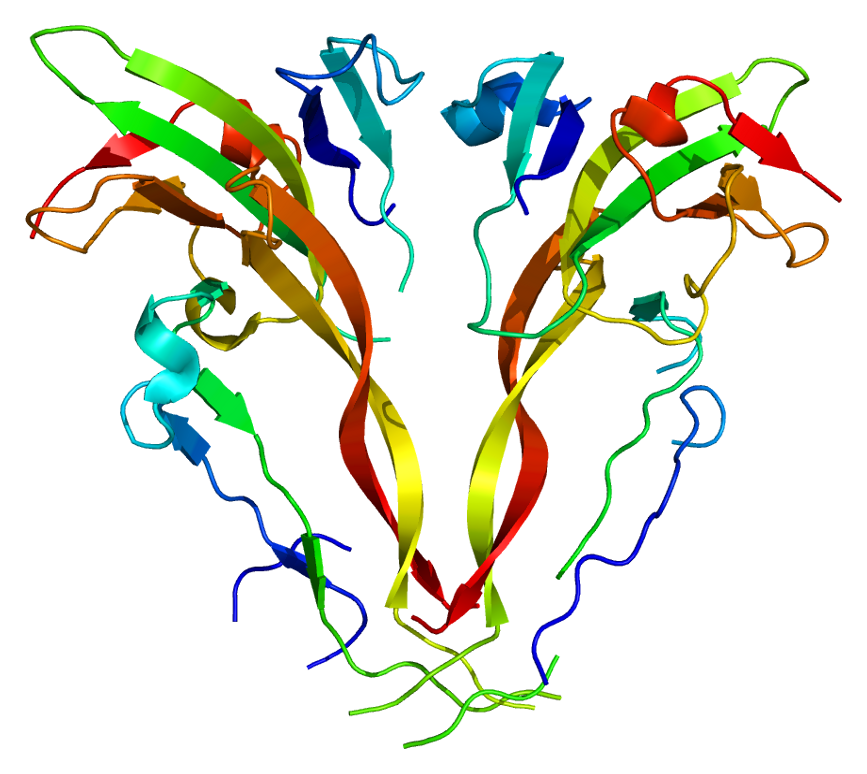

Identifiers
- Aliases: ACVR2B, ACTRIIB, ActR-IIB, HTX4, activin A receptor type 2B
- External IDs: OMIM: 602730; MGI: 87912; GeneCards: ACVR2B
Available structures
PDB	Ortholog search: PDBe RCSB
PDB	List of PDB id codes 2QLU, 4FAO, 2H62
Enzyme activity
EC #	BRENDA	ExPASy	KEGG	MetaCyc
2.7.11.30	↗	↗	↗	↗

Gene location (Human)
Chr.	Chromosome 3 (human)
Band	3p22.2	Start	38,453,890 bp
Band	3p22.2	End	38,493,142 bp

Gene location (Mouse)
Chr.	Chromosome 9 (mouse)
Band	9|9 F3	Start	119,231,184 bp
Band	9|9 F3	End	119,264,061 bp
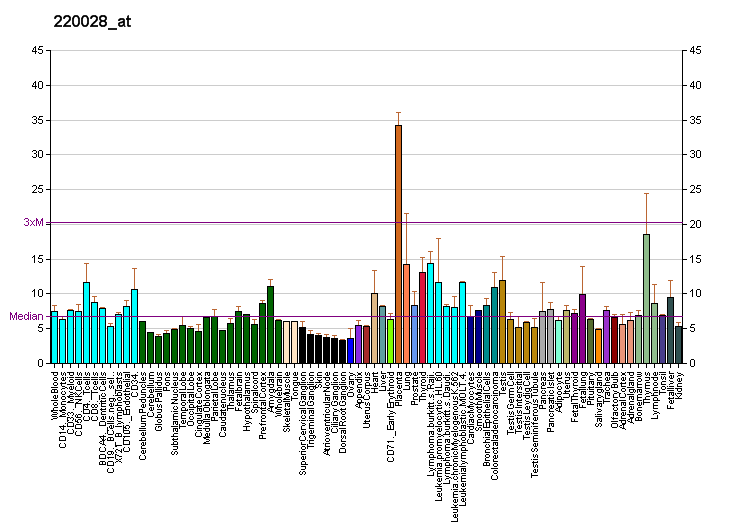
RNA expression pattern
Bgee	Human / Mouse (ortholog); Top expressed in: secondary oocyte; ganglionic eminence; endothelial cell; parotid gland; ventricular zone; Skeletal muscle tissue of biceps brachii; testicle; retinal pigment epithelium; lateral nuclear group of thalamus; Skeletal muscle tissue of rectus abdominis / Top expressed in: Rostral migratory stream; somite; tail of embryo; renal corpuscle; epithelium of lens; epiblast; Ileal epithelium; mandibular prominence; embryo; maxillary prominence; More reference expression data
BioGPS	More reference expression data
Gene ontology
Molecular function	transferase activity; nucleotide binding; protein kinase activity; growth factor binding; activin binding; metal ion binding; kinase activity; protein serine/threonine kinase activity; transmembrane receptor protein serine/threonine kinase activity; protein binding; protein serine/threonine/tyrosine kinase activity; activin receptor activity, type II; ATP binding; transforming growth factor beta-activated receptor activity; transforming growth factor beta receptor activity, type II; type I transforming growth factor beta receptor binding; SMAD binding
Cellular component	cytoplasm; integral component of membrane; membrane; receptor complex; plasma membrane; integral component of plasma membrane; protein-containing complex; activin receptor complex
Biological process	pattern specification process; skeletal system development; roof of mouth development; regulation of transcription, DNA-templated; organ growth; embryonic foregut morphogenesis; kidney development; lymphangiogenesis; lung development; positive regulation of bone mineralization; retina vasculature development in camera-type eye; phosphorylation; lymphatic endothelial cell differentiation; skeletal system morphogenesis; gastrulation with mouth forming second; insulin secretion; negative regulation of transcription by RNA polymerase II; response to glucose; post-embryonic development; BMP signaling pathway; venous blood vessel development; odontogenesis of dentin-containing tooth; protein phosphorylation; development of the heart; blood vessel remodeling; determination of left/right symmetry; positive regulation of osteoblast differentiation; transmembrane receptor protein serine/threonine kinase signaling pathway; positive regulation of activin receptor signaling pathway; regulation of signal transduction; artery development; pancreas development; mesoderm development; activation of protein kinase activity; signal transduction; anterior/posterior pattern specification; activin receptor signaling pathway; transforming growth factor beta receptor signaling pathway; negative regulation of cold-induced thermogenesis
Sources:Amigo / QuickGO
Orthologs
Databases	NCBI: entry; OMA: entry
Species	Human	Mouse
Entrez	93	11481
Ensembl	ENSG00000114739	ENSMUSG00000061393
UniProt	Q13705	P27040
RefSeq (mRNA)	NM_001106	NM_007397; NM_001313757
RefSeq (protein)	NP_001097	NP_001300686; NP_031423
Location (UCSC)	Chr 3: 38.45 – 38.49 Mb	Chr 9: 119.23 – 119.26 Mb
PubMed search
- Wikidata
View/Edit Human	View/Edit Mouse

Activin receptor type-2B is a protein that in humans is encoded by the ACVR2B gene. ACVR2B is an activin type 2 receptor.

== Function ==
Activins are dimeric growth and differentiation factors which belong to the transforming growth factor-beta (TGF-beta) superfamily of structurally related signaling proteins. Activins signal through a heteromeric complex of receptor serine kinases which include at least two type I (I and IB) and two type II (II and IIB) receptors. These receptors are all transmembrane proteins, composed of a ligand-binding extracellular domain with cysteine-rich region, a transmembrane domain, and a cytoplasmic domain with predicted serine/threonine specificity. Type I receptors are essential for signaling; and type II receptors are required for binding ligands and for expression of type I receptors. Type I and II receptors form a stable complex after ligand binding, resulting in phosphorylation of type I receptors by type II receptors. Type II receptors are considered to be constitutively active kinases. This gene encodes activin A type IIB receptor, which displays a 3- to 4-fold higher affinity for the ligand than activin A type II receptor.

== Interactions ==
ACVR2B has been shown to interact with ACVR1B and SYNJ2BP.
