= ACVR2A =

Protein-coding gene in humans

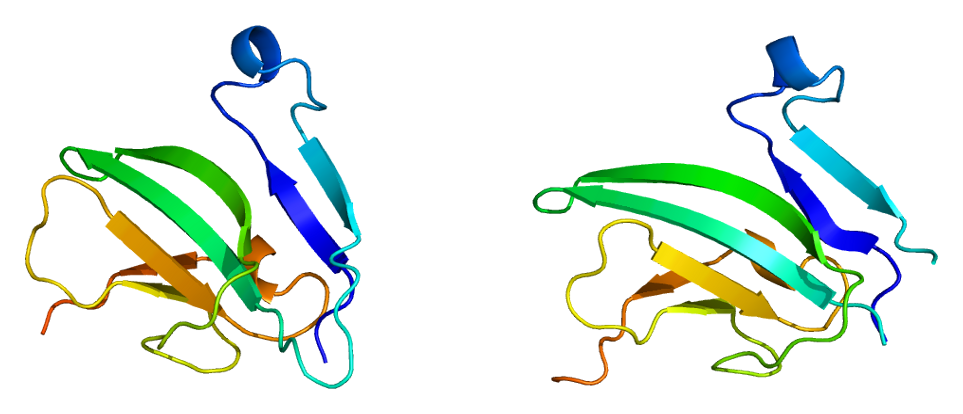

Identifiers
- Aliases: ACVR2A, ACTRII, ACVR2, activin A receptor type 2A
- External IDs: OMIM: 102581; MGI: 102806; GeneCards: ACVR2A
Available structures
PDB	Ortholog search: PDBe RCSB
PDB	List of PDB id codes 3Q4T, 3SOC, 4ASX
Enzyme activity
EC #	BRENDA	ExPASy	KEGG	MetaCyc
2.7.11.30	↗	↗	↗	↗

Gene location (Human)
Chr.	Chromosome 2 (human)
Band	2q22.3-q23.1	Start	147,844,517 bp
Band	2q22.3-q23.1	End	147,930,826 bp

Gene location (Mouse)
Chr.	Chromosome 2 (mouse)
Band	2 C1.1|2 28.38 cM	Start	48,704,121 bp
Band	2 C1.1|2 28.38 cM	End	48,793,281 bp
RNA expression pattern
Bgee	Human / Mouse (ortholog); Top expressed in: buccal mucosa cell; hair follicle; oocyte; skin of thigh; testicle; skin of abdomen; lactiferous duct; ganglionic eminence; tendon; Achilles tendon / Top expressed in: trigeminal ganglion; olfactory tubercle; subiculum; anterior amygdaloid area; medial ganglionic eminence; epithelium of lens; triceps brachii muscle; tail of embryo; genital tubercle; nucleus accumbens; More reference expression data
BioGPS	n/a
Gene ontology
Molecular function	transferase activity; nucleotide binding; protein kinase activity; PDZ domain binding; growth factor binding; coreceptor activity; activin binding; metal ion binding; kinase activity; protein self-association; protein serine/threonine kinase activity; transmembrane receptor protein serine/threonine kinase activity; inhibin binding; protein binding; activin-activated receptor activity; ATP binding; BMP receptor activity; transforming growth factor beta-activated receptor activity; transforming growth factor beta receptor activity, type II; type I transforming growth factor beta receptor binding; SMAD binding
Cellular component	cytoplasm; integral component of membrane; inhibin-betaglycan-ActRII complex; membrane; receptor complex; plasma membrane; integral component of plasma membrane; cell surface; activin receptor complex
Biological process	positive regulation of protein phosphorylation; male gonad development; ejaculation; positive regulation of erythrocyte differentiation; positive regulation of bone mineralization; phosphorylation; positive regulation of pathway-restricted SMAD protein phosphorylation; gastrulation with mouth forming second; penile erection; regulation of nitric-oxide synthase activity; cellular response to BMP stimulus; Sertoli cell proliferation; BMP signaling pathway; embryonic skeletal system development; regulation of BMP signaling pathway; protein phosphorylation; determination of left/right symmetry; transmembrane receptor protein serine/threonine kinase signaling pathway; positive regulation of activin receptor signaling pathway; positive regulation of osteoblast differentiation; regulation of signal transduction; spermatogenesis; mesoderm development; anterior/posterior pattern specification; positive regulation of transcription by RNA polymerase II; activin receptor signaling pathway; transforming growth factor beta receptor signaling pathway; pattern specification process
Sources:Amigo / QuickGO
Orthologs
Databases	NCBI: entry; OMA: entry
Species	Human	Mouse
Entrez	92	11480
Ensembl	ENSG00000121989	ENSMUSG00000052155
UniProt	P27037	P27038
RefSeq (mRNA)	NM_001278579; NM_001278580; NM_001616	NM_007396
RefSeq (protein)	NP_001265508; NP_001265509; NP_001607	NP_031422
Location (UCSC)	Chr 2: 147.84 – 147.93 Mb	Chr 2: 48.7 – 48.79 Mb
PubMed search
- Wikidata
View/Edit Human	View/Edit Mouse

Activin receptor type-2A is a protein that in humans is encoded by the ACVR2A gene. ACVR2A is an activin type 2 receptor.

== Function ==
This gene encodes activin A type II receptor. Activins are dimeric growth and differentiation factors which belong to the transforming growth factor-beta (TGF-beta) superfamily of structurally related signaling proteins. Activins signal through a heteromeric complex of receptor serine kinases which include at least two type I (I and IB) and two type II (II and IIB) receptors. These receptors are all transmembrane proteins, composed of a ligand-binding extracellular domain with cysteine-rich region, a transmembrane domain, and a cytoplasmic domain with predicted serine/threonine specificity. Type I receptors are essential for signaling; and type II receptors are required for binding ligands and for expression of type I receptors. Type I and II receptors form a stable complex after ligand binding, resulting in phosphorylation of type I receptors by type II receptors. Type II receptors are considered to be constitutively active kinases.

== Interactions ==
ACVR2A has been shown to interact with:

- ACVR1B,
- INHBA, and
- SYNJ2BP.
