= Transforming growth factor beta superfamily =

Protein family

Transforming growth factor beta like domain
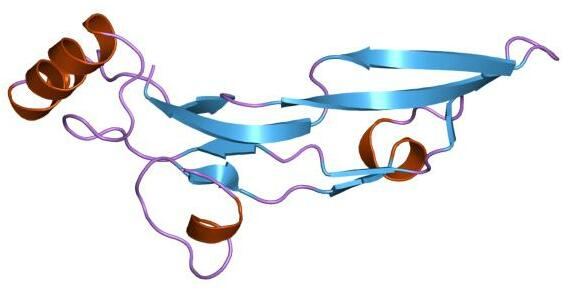
- Structure of human transforming growth factor-beta 2.

Identifiers
- Symbol: TGF_beta
- Pfam: PF00019
- Pfam clan: CL0079
- InterPro: IPR001839
- PROSITE: PDOC00223
- SCOP2: 1tfg / SCOPe / SUPFAM
Available protein structures:
- PDB: IPR001839 PF00019 (ECOD; PDBsum)
- AlphaFold: IPR001839; PF00019

The transforming growth factor beta (TGF-β) superfamily is a large group of structurally related cell regulatory proteins that was named after its first member, TGF-β1, originally described in 1983. They interact with TGF-beta receptors.

Many proteins have since been described as members of the TGF-β superfamily in a variety of species, including invertebrates as well as vertebrates and categorized into 23 distinct gene types that fall into four major subfamilies:

- The TGF-β subfamily
- The bone morphogenetic proteins and the growth differentiation factors
- The activin and inhibin subfamilies
- The left-right determination factors
- A group encompassing various divergent members

Transforming growth factor-beta (TGF-beta) is a multifunctional peptide that controls proliferation, differentiation and other functions in many cell types. TGF-beta-1 is a peptide of 112 amino acid residues derived by proteolytic cleavage from the C-terminal of a precursor protein. These proteins interact with a conserved family of cell surface serine/threonine-specific protein kinase receptors, and generate intracellular signals using a conserved family of proteins called SMADs. They play fundamental roles in the regulation of basic biological processes such as growth, development, tissue homeostasis and regulation of the immune system.

== Structure ==
Proteins from the TGF-beta superfamily are only active as homo- or heterodimer; the two chains being linked by a single disulfide bond. From X-ray studies of TGF-beta-2, it is known that all the other cysteines are involved in intrachain disulfide bonds. As shown in the following schematic representation, there are four disulfide bonds in the TGF-beta's and in inhibin beta chains, while the other members of this superfamily lack the first bond.

                                                     interchain
                                                     |
          +------------------------------------------|+
          |                                          ||
xxxxcxxxxxCcxxxxxxxxxxxxxxxxxxCxxCxxxxxxxxxxxxxxxxxxxCCxxxxxxxxxxxxxxxxxxxCxCx
    |      |                  |  |                                        | |
    +------+                  +--|----------------------------------------+ |
                                 +------------------------------------------+

where 'C' denotes a conserved cysteine involved in a disulfide bond.

== Examples ==
Human genes encoding proteins that contain this domain include:

AMH; ARTN; BMP2; BMP3; BMP4; BMP5; BMP6; BMP7; BMP8A; BMP8B; BMP10; BMP15; GDF1; GDF2; GDF3; GDF5; GDF6; GDF7; GDF9; GDF10; GDF11; GDF15; GDNF; INHA; INHBA; INHBB; INHBC; INHBE; LEFTY1; LEFTY2; MSTN; NODAL; NRTN; PSPN; TGFB1; TGFB2; TGFB3;
