= Growth differentiation factor =

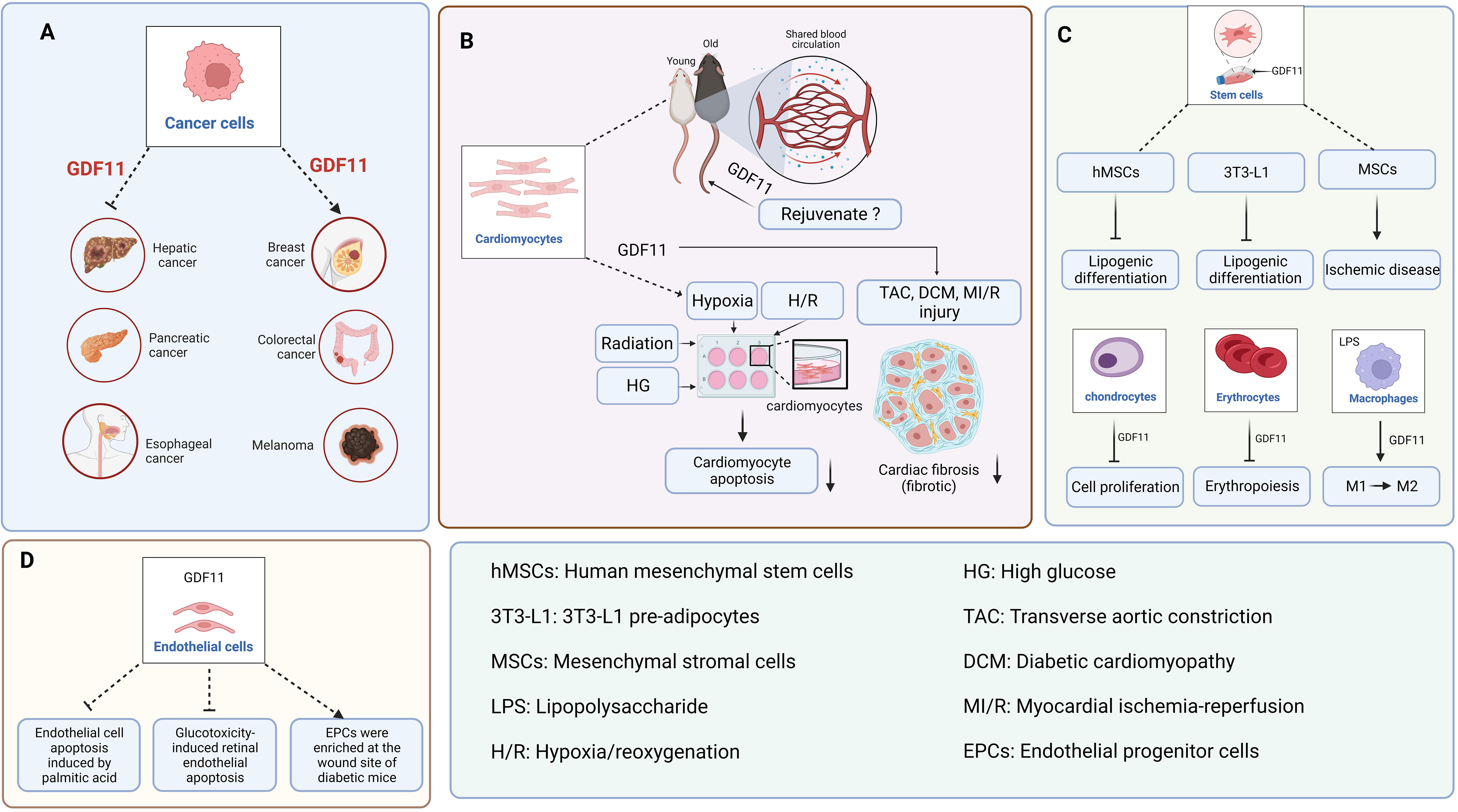
The function of GDF11 in various cells

Growth differentiation factors (GDFs) are a subfamily of proteins belonging to the transforming growth factor beta superfamily that have functions predominantly in development.

== Types ==
Several members of this subfamily have been described, and named GDF1 through GDF15.

- GDF1 is expressed chiefly in the nervous system and functions in left-right patterning and mesoderm induction during embryonic development.
- GDF2 (also known as BMP9) induces and maintains the response embryonic basal forebrain cholinergic neurons (BFCN) have to a neurotransmitter called acetylcholine, and regulates iron metabolism by increasing levels of a protein called hepcidin.
- GDF3 is also known as "Vg-related gene 2" (Vgr-2). Expression of GDF3 occurs in ossifying bone during embryonic development and in the thymus, spleen, bone marrow brain, and adipose tissue of adults. It has a dual nature of function; it both inhibits and induces early stages of development in embryos.
- GDF5 is expressed in the developing central nervous system, with roles in the development of joints and the skeleton, and increasing the survival of neurones that respond to a neurotransmitter called dopamine.
- GDF6 interacts with bone morphogenetic proteins to regulate ectoderm patterning, and controls eye development.
- GDF8 is now officially known as myostatin and controls the growth of muscle tissue.
- GDF9, like GDF3, lacks one cysteine relative to other members of the TGF-β superfamily. Its gene expression is limited to the ovaries, and it has a role in ovulation.
- GDF10 is closely related to BMP3 and has a roles in head formation and, it is presumed, in skeletal morphogenesis. It is also known as BMP-3b.
- GDF11 controls anterior-posterior patterning by regulating the expression of Hox genes, and regulates the number of olfactory receptor neurons occurring in the olfactory epithelium, and numbers of retinal ganglionic cells developing in the retina.
- GDF15 (also known as TGF-PL, MIC-1, PDF, PLAB, and PTGFB) has a role in regulating inflammatory and apoptotic pathways during tissue injury and certain disease processes.
