= Daf-3 =

Dwarfin sma

Identifiers
- Organism: Caenorhabditis elegans
- Symbol: daf-3
- Entrez: 180431
- RefSeq (mRNA): NM_075760.6
- RefSeq (Prot): NP_508161.3
- UniProt: Q95QI7

Other data
- Chromosome: X: 0.82 - 0.83 Mb
Search for
- Structures: Swiss-model
- Domains: InterPro

The DAF-3 or Dwarfin sma is a nematode Caenorhabditis elegans gene encoding a Co-SMAD protein of TGF-beta signaling pathway. Without daf-7 signal, DAF-3 combined with transcription factor daf-5 to form a heterodimer and started dauer development. When daf-7 binds to the receptors daf-1/daf-4, the phosphorylated daf-8/daf-14 heterodimer enter to the nucleus to inhibit this transcription.
