= Bone morphogenetic protein 8 =

Bone morphogenetic protein 8 (BMP8) may refer to:

- Bone morphogenetic protein 8A (BMP8A)
- Bone morphogenetic protein 8B (BMP8B)

== See also ==
- Bone morphogenetic protein
