= Urist =

Urist is a surname. Notable people with the surname include:

- Marshall R. Urist (1914–2001), American orthopedic surgeon
- Sarah Urist Green (born 1979), American art museum curator and television host
