= Daf-1 =

Protein-coding gene in the species Caenorhabditis elegans

abnormal dauer formation protein 1

Identifiers
- Organism: Caenorhabditis elegans
- Symbol: daf-1
- Entrez: 176829
- HomoloGene: 134382
- UniProt: P20792

Other data
- Chromosome: IV: 0.13 - 0.14 Mb
Search for
- Structures: Swiss-model
- Domains: InterPro

The DAF-1 gene encodes for a cell surface Enzyme-linked receptor of TGF-beta signaling pathway in the worm Caenorhabditis elegans. DAF-1 is one of the type I receptor of TGF-beta pathway. DAF-1 acts as a receptor protein serine/threonine kinase, is activated by type II receptor Daf-4 phosphorylation after the ligand Daf-7 binds to the receptor heterotetramer, and then phosphorylates Daf-8 or Daf-14, the SMAD proteins in C. elegans.
