= Daf-14 =

MH2 domain-containing protein

Identifiers
- Organism: Caenorhabditis elegans
- Symbol: daf-14
- Entrez: 177908
- RefSeq (mRNA): NM_001268546.3
- RefSeq (Prot): NP_001255475.1
- UniProt: G5EEP2

Other data
- Chromosome: IV: 10.25 - 10.26 Mb
Search for
- Structures: Swiss-model
- Domains: InterPro

The DAF-14 is a gene of the nematode Caenorhabditis elegans encoding a R-SMAD protein of TGF-beta signaling pathway, which will be phosphorylated and forms a heterodimer with phosphorylated daf-8 when the TGF-β ligand daf-7 binds to the TGF-β receptors daf-1/daf-4, then the heterodimer enter to the nucleus to inhibit transcription regulated by daf-3/daf-5.
