= GDF10 =

Protein-coding gene in the species Homo sapiens

Identifiers
- Aliases: GDF10, BMP-3b, BMP3B, growth differentiation factor 10, BIP
- External IDs: OMIM: 601361; MGI: 95684; HomoloGene: 3640; GeneCards: GDF10; OMA:GDF10 - orthologs

Gene location (Human)
Chr.	Chromosome 10 (human)
Band	10q11.22	Start	47,300,197 bp
Band	10q11.22	End	47,313,577 bp

Gene location (Mouse)
Chr.	Chromosome 14 (mouse)
Band	14 B|14 20.8 cM	Start	33,645,544 bp
Band	14 B|14 20.8 cM	End	33,659,940 bp
RNA expression pattern
Bgee	Human / Mouse (ortholog); Top expressed in: testicle; right lung; upper lobe of left lung; tibial nerve; tibia; body of pancreas; popliteal artery; tibial arteries; Descending thoracic aorta; subcutaneous adipose tissue / Top expressed in: calvaria; efferent ductule; body wall; ankle; lower lip; cerebellar vermis; tunica adventitia of aorta; lobe of cerebellum; internal carotid artery; ankle joint; More reference expression data
BioGPS	n/a
Gene ontology
Molecular function	transforming growth factor beta receptor binding; cytokine activity; growth factor activity
Cellular component	extracellular region; extracellular space; extracellular matrix; collagen-containing extracellular matrix
Biological process	regulation of apoptotic process; skeletal system development; positive regulation of pathway-restricted SMAD protein phosphorylation; regulation of MAPK cascade; transforming growth factor beta receptor signaling pathway; SMAD protein signal transduction; fat cell differentiation; cell development; BMP signaling pathway; osteoblast differentiation; negative regulation of osteoblast differentiation; ossification; regulation of signaling receptor activity
Sources:Amigo / QuickGO
Orthologs
Species	Human	Mouse
Entrez	2662	14560
Ensembl	ENSG00000266524	ENSMUSG00000021943
UniProt	P55107	P97737
RefSeq (mRNA)	NM_004962	NM_145741
RefSeq (protein)	NP_004953	NP_665684
Location (UCSC)	Chr 10: 47.3 – 47.31 Mb	Chr 14: 33.65 – 33.66 Mb
PubMed search
- Wikidata
View/Edit Human	View/Edit Mouse

Growth differentiation factor 10 (GDF10) also known as bone morphogenetic protein 3B (BMP-3B) is a protein that in humans is encoded by the GDF10 gene.

GDF10 belongs to the transforming growth factor beta superfamily that is closely related to bone morphogenetic protein-3 (BMP3). It plays a role in head formation and may have multiple roles in skeletal morphogenesis. GDF10 is also known as BMP-3b, with GDF10 and BMP3 regarded as a separate subgroup within the TGF-beta superfamily.

In mice, GDF10 mRNA is abundant in the brain, inner ear, uterus, prostate, neural tissues, blood vessels and adipose tissue with low expression in spleen and liver. It is also present in bone of both adults and neonatal mice. Human GDF10 mRNA is found in the cochlea and lung of foetuses, and in testis, retina, pineal gland, and other neural tissues of adults.
