= Daf-7 =

abnormal dauer formation protein 7

Identifiers
- Organism: Caenorhabditis elegans
- Symbol: daf-7
- Entrez: 175237
- HomoloGene: 21183
- RefSeq (mRNA): NM_064864.5
- RefSeq (Prot): NP_497265.1
- UniProt: P92172

Other data
- Chromosome: III: 0.81 - 0.81 Mb
Search for
- Structures: Swiss-model
- Domains: InterPro

The DAF-7 gene encodes for the ortholog of GDF11, a ligand of TGF-beta signaling pathway, in the worm Caenorhabditis elegans. When binds to the complex of type II receptor Daf-4 and type I receptor Daf-1, this receptor protein serine/threonine kinase will phosphorylation activate the Smad Protein Daf-8/14.
