= Daf-8 =

Dwarfin sma

Identifiers
- Organism: Caenorhabditis elegans
- Symbol: daf-8
- Entrez: 187612
- RefSeq (mRNA): NM_059920.3
- RefSeq (Prot): NP_492321.1
- UniProt: Q21733

Other data
- Chromosome: I: 8.58 - 8.59 Mb
Search for
- Structures: Swiss-model
- Domains: InterPro

The DAF-8 nematode gene encoding a R-SMAD protein of TGF-beta signaling pathway, which was originally found in model organism Caenorhabditis elegans. When the TGF-β ligand daf-7 binds to the TGF-β receptors daf-1/daf-4 on the surface of nematode cell, daf-8 will be phosphorylated and forms a heterodimer with daf-14, then enter to the nucleus to inhibit transcription regulated by daf-3/daf-5.
