= GDF3 =

Protein-coding gene in humans

Identifiers
- Aliases: GDF3, KFS3, MCOP7, MCOPCB6, growth differentiation factor 3
- External IDs: OMIM: 606522; MGI: 95686; HomoloGene: 7336; GeneCards: GDF3; OMA:GDF3 - orthologs

Gene location (Human)
Chr.	Chromosome 12 (human)
Band	12p13.31	Start	7,689,784 bp
Band	12p13.31	End	7,695,775 bp

Gene location (Mouse)
Chr.	Chromosome 6 (mouse)
Band	6 F1|6 57.7 cM	Start	122,582,362 bp
Band	6 F1|6 57.7 cM	End	122,587,046 bp
RNA expression pattern
Bgee	Human / Mouse (ortholog); Top expressed in: gonad; testicle; spleen; muscle tissue; lymph node; smooth muscle tissue; right adrenal gland; adrenal cortex; left adrenal cortex; right adrenal cortex / Top expressed in: blastocyst; morula; embryo; gastrula; epiblast; embryo; submandibular gland; right ventricle; knee joint; bone marrow; More reference expression data
BioGPS	n/a
Gene ontology
Molecular function	cytokine activity; transforming growth factor beta receptor binding; growth factor activity; protein kinase binding
Cellular component	extracellular region; extracellular space; cytoplasm
Biological process	eye development; response to dietary excess; regulation of apoptotic process; skeletal system development; regulation of cell fate commitment; negative regulation of myoblast differentiation; endoderm development; regulation of MAPK cascade; SMAD protein signal transduction; cell development; somite rostral/caudal axis specification; positive regulation of pathway-restricted SMAD protein phosphorylation; notochord development; formation of anatomical boundary; in utero embryonic development; negative regulation of BMP signaling pathway; negative regulation of epidermal cell differentiation; mesoderm development; primitive streak formation; signal transduction; multicellular organism development; positive regulation of fat cell differentiation; regulation of signaling receptor activity; BMP signaling pathway
Sources:Amigo / QuickGO
Orthologs
Species	Human	Mouse
Entrez	9573	14562
Ensembl	ENSG00000184344	ENSMUSG00000030117
UniProt	Q9NR23	Q07104
RefSeq (mRNA)	NM_020634	NM_008108
RefSeq (protein)	NP_065685	NP_032134
Location (UCSC)	Chr 12: 7.69 – 7.7 Mb	Chr 6: 122.58 – 122.59 Mb
PubMed search
- Wikidata
View/Edit Human	View/Edit Mouse

Growth differentiation factor-3 (GDF3), also known as Vg-related gene 2 (Vgr-2) is protein that in humans is encoded by the GDF3 gene. GDF3 belongs to the transforming growth factor beta (TGF-β) superfamily. It has high similarity to other TGF-β superfamily members including Vg1 (found in frogs) and GDF1.

== Tissue distribution ==
Expression of GDF3 occurs in ossifying bone during embryonic development and in the brain, thymus, spleen, bone marrow and adipose tissue of adults.

== Function ==
GDF3 is a bi-functional protein that has some intrinsic activity and also modulate other TGF-β superfamily members, e.g. potentiates the activity of NODAL. It may also inhibit other TGF-β superfamily members (i.e. BMPs), thus regulating the balance between different modes of TGF-beta signaling. It has been shown to negatively and positively control differentiation of embryonic stem cells in mice and humans. This molecule plays a role in mesoderm and definitive endoderm formation during the pre-gastrulation stages of development.
