= GDF7 =

Protein-coding gene in the species Homo sapiens

Identifiers
- Aliases: GDF7, BMP12, growth differentiation factor 7
- External IDs: OMIM: 604651; MGI: 95690; HomoloGene: 32177; GeneCards: GDF7; OMA:GDF7 - orthologs

Gene location (Human)
Chr.	Chromosome 2 (human)
Band	2p24.1	Start	20,667,144 bp
Band	2p24.1	End	20,679,243 bp

Gene location (Mouse)
Chr.	Chromosome 12 (mouse)
Band	12|12 A1.1	Start	8,347,918 bp
Band	12|12 A1.1	End	8,351,954 bp
RNA expression pattern
Bgee	Human / Mouse (ortholog); Top expressed in: seminal vesicula; endometrium; Descending thoracic aorta; ascending aorta; mucosa of paranasal sinus; ectocervix; right coronary artery; canal of the cervix; kidney tubule; popliteal artery / Top expressed in: uterus; embryo; finger; foot; shoulder; toe; rhombencephalon; cerebellar cortex; striatum of neuraxis; primary visual cortex; More reference expression data
BioGPS	n/a
Gene ontology
Molecular function	cytokine activity; protein homodimerization activity; protein binding; transforming growth factor beta receptor binding; growth factor activity
Cellular component	extracellular region; extracellular space
Biological process	regulation of apoptotic process; pathway-restricted SMAD protein phosphorylation; cell fate commitment; epithelial cell differentiation; regulation of MAPK cascade; SMAD protein signal transduction; spinal cord association neuron differentiation; cell development; positive regulation of tendon cell differentiation; positive regulation of pathway-restricted SMAD protein phosphorylation; roof plate formation; BMP signaling pathway; axon guidance; reproductive structure development; positive regulation of transcription, DNA-templated; forebrain morphogenesis; gland morphogenesis; positive regulation of gene expression; positive regulation of neuron differentiation; neural tube development; branching morphogenesis of an epithelial tube; midbrain development; activin receptor signaling pathway; morphogenesis of an epithelial fold; regulation of signaling receptor activity
Sources:Amigo / QuickGO
Orthologs
Species	Human	Mouse
Entrez	151449	238057
Ensembl	ENSG00000143869	ENSMUSG00000037660
UniProt	Q7Z4P5	P43029
RefSeq (mRNA)	NM_182828	NM_013527; NM_001312876
RefSeq (protein)	NP_878248	NP_001299805; NP_038555
Location (UCSC)	Chr 2: 20.67 – 20.68 Mb	Chr 12: 8.35 – 8.35 Mb
PubMed search
- Wikidata
View/Edit Human	View/Edit Mouse

Growth differentiation factor 7 (GDF7) is a protein that in humans is encoded by the GDF7 gene.

GDF7 belongs to the transforming growth factor beta superfamily that is specifically found in a signaling center known as the roof plate that is located in the developing nervous system of embryos. The roof plate is required for the generation of several classes of spinal cord dorsal interneurons; GDF7 specifically induces the formation of sensory neurons in the dorsal spinal cord from neural crest cells by generating signals within the roof plate.

GDF7 is also known as bone morphogenic protein 12 (BMP-12).
