= Bone morphogenetic protein 4 =

Human protein and coding gene

BMP4

Identifiers
- Aliases: BMP4, BMP2B, BMP2B1, MCOPS6, OFC11, ZYME, bone morphogenetic protein 4
- External IDs: OMIM: 112262; MGI: 88180; GeneCards: BMP4

Gene location (Mouse)
Chr.	Chromosome 14 (mouse)
Band	14 C1|14 23.95 cM	Start	46,620,977 bp
Band	14 C1|14 23.95 cM	End	46,628,126 bp
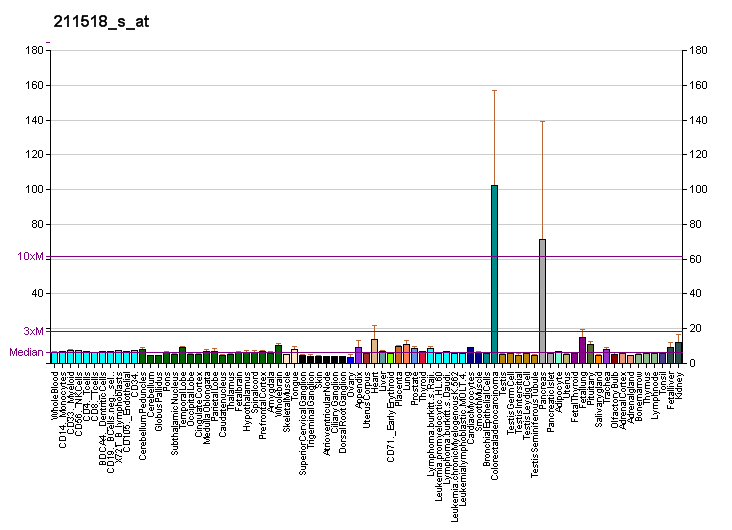
RNA expression pattern
Bgee	Human / Mouse (ortholog); n/a / Top expressed in: meninges; semicircular canal; genital tubercle; surface ectoderm; abdominal wall; posterior semicircular canal; migratory enteric neural crest cell; amnion; calvaria; external carotid artery
BioGPS	More reference expression data
Gene ontology
Molecular function	heparin binding; cytokine activity; co-receptor binding; transforming growth factor beta receptor binding; growth factor activity; BMP receptor binding; protein binding; chemoattractant activity
Cellular component	extracellular region; extracellular space; endoplasmic reticulum lumen
Biological process	embryonic skeletal system morphogenesis; negative regulation of T cell differentiation in thymus; germ cell development; skeletal system development; mesenchymal cell differentiation involved in renal system development; cardiac septum development; ureteric bud development; positive regulation of protein phosphorylation; renal system process; positive regulation of endothelial cell differentiation; negative regulation of immature T cell proliferation in thymus; bud elongation involved in lung branching; tendon cell differentiation; anatomical structure formation involved in morphogenesis; ureter epithelial cell differentiation; negative regulation of cell cycle; mesenchymal to epithelial transition involved in metanephros morphogenesis; trachea development; post-embryonic development; monocyte differentiation; specification of ureteric bud anterior/posterior symmetry by BMP signaling pathway; blood vessel endothelial cell proliferation involved in sprouting angiogenesis; BMP signaling pathway involved in renal system segmentation; cranial suture morphogenesis; mesonephros development; odontogenesis of dentin-containing tooth; telencephalon regionalization; negative regulation of chondrocyte differentiation; blood vessel development; negative regulation of mitotic nuclear division; angiogenesis; prostate gland morphogenesis; positive regulation of ERK1 and ERK2 cascade; smooth muscle tissue development; BMP signaling pathway involved in heart induction; negative regulation of epithelial cell proliferation; tissue development; metanephric collecting duct development; inner ear receptor cell differentiation; mesodermal cell fate determination; metanephros development; type B pancreatic cell development; regulation of pathway-restricted SMAD protein phosphorylation; negative regulation of cell population proliferation; steroid hormone mediated signaling pathway; mammary gland formation; positive regulation of collagen biosynthetic process; renal system development; negative regulation of myoblast differentiation; cell fate commitment; common-partner SMAD protein phosphorylation; glomerular visceral epithelial cell development; SMAD protein signal transduction; ossification; kidney development; lung development; ureter smooth muscle cell differentiation; embryonic digit morphogenesis; epithelial-mesenchymal cell signaling; negative regulation of thymocyte apoptotic process; mesenchymal cell differentiation involved in kidney development; negative regulation of cell death; regulation of odontogenesis of dentin-containing tooth; BMP signaling pathway involved in ureter morphogenesis; mesenchymal cell proliferation involved in ureteric bud development; smooth muscle cell differentiation; lymphoid progenitor cell differentiation; epithelium development; positive regulation of transcription, DNA-templated; deltoid tuberosity development; negative regulation of prostatic bud formation; development of the heart; telencephalon development; branching involved in ureteric bud morphogenesis; positive regulation of kidney development; cartilage development; embryonic limb morphogenesis; negative regulation of MAP kinase activity; positive regulation of cartilage development; lens induction in camera-type eye; positive regulation of neuron differentiation; branching involved in prostate gland morphogenesis; regulation of protein import into nucleus; positive regulation of cell differentiation; erythrocyte differentiation; smoothened signaling pathway; camera-type eye development; secondary heart field specification; negative regulation of phosphorylation; regulation of smooth muscle cell differentiation; regulation of cell fate commitment; regulation of branching involved in prostate gland morphogenesis; cell differentiation; positive regulation of branching involved in lung morphogenesis; chondrocyte differentiation; regulation of cartilage development; organ induction; positive regulation of epithelial cell proliferation; epithelial cell proliferation involved in lung morphogenesis; negative regulation of cell proliferation involved in heart morphogenesis; negative regulation of apoptotic process; positive regulation of ossification; endochondral ossification; regulation of smooth muscle cell proliferation; regulation of morphogenesis of a branching structure; BMP signaling pathway; macrophage differentiation; negative regulation of metanephric comma-shaped body morphogenesis; embryonic skeletal system development; mesenchymal cell proliferation involved in ureter development; osteoblast differentiation; hematopoietic progenitor cell differentiation; positive regulation of BMP signaling pathway; regulation of gene expression; embryonic cranial skeleton morphogenesis; dorsal/ventral neural tube patterning; lung alveolus development; positive regulation of protein binding; anterior/posterior axis specification; negative regulation of transcription, DNA-templated; positive regulation of epidermal cell differentiation; branching morphogenesis of an epithelial tube; trachea formation; specification of animal organ position; negative regulation of glomerular mesangial cell proliferation; positive regulation of smooth muscle cell proliferation; intermediate mesodermal cell differentiation; pulmonary artery endothelial tube morphogenesis; pituitary gland development; positive regulation of cell death; lung morphogenesis; positive regulation of endothelial cell proliferation; bud dilation involved in lung branching; positive regulation of cardiac muscle fiber development; negative regulation of striated muscle tissue development; positive regulation of cell migration; negative regulation of branch elongation involved in ureteric bud branching by BMP signaling pathway; BMP signaling pathway involved in nephric duct formation; positive regulation of pathway-restricted SMAD protein phosphorylation; negative regulation of mesenchymal cell proliferation involved in ureter development; mesoderm formation; cellular response to growth factor stimulus; glomerular capillary formation; bronchus development; positive regulation of endothelial cell migration; multicellular organism development; negative regulation of metanephric S-shaped body morphogenesis; neural tube closure; vasculature development; embryonic morphogenesis; protein localization to nucleus; positive regulation of apoptotic process; embryonic skeletal joint morphogenesis; regulation of cell differentiation; negative regulation of branching involved in ureteric bud morphogenesis; mesodermal cell differentiation; neuron fate commitment; forebrain development; cloacal septation; bone development; camera-type eye morphogenesis; positive regulation of SMAD protein signal transduction; negative regulation of glomerulus development; embryonic hindlimb morphogenesis; positive chemotaxis; outflow tract morphogenesis; odontogenesis; negative regulation of transcription by RNA polymerase II; epithelial to mesenchymal transition involved in endocardial cushion formation; cardiac jelly development; cellular response to BMP stimulus; positive regulation of osteoblast differentiation; epithelial tube branching involved in lung morphogenesis; cardiac muscle cell differentiation; apoptotic process involved in endocardial cushion morphogenesis; muscular septum morphogenesis; positive regulation of transcription by RNA polymerase II; positive regulation of bone mineralization; cardiac right ventricle morphogenesis; outflow tract septum morphogenesis; membranous septum morphogenesis; aortic valve morphogenesis; pulmonary valve morphogenesis; endocardial cushion development; endoderm development; coronary vasculature development; BMP signaling pathway involved in heart development; pharyngeal arch artery morphogenesis; positive regulation of cell proliferation involved in outflow tract morphogenesis; negative regulation of extrinsic apoptotic signaling pathway; regulation of pri-miRNA transcription by RNA polymerase II; positive regulation of production of miRNAs involved in gene silencing by miRNA; post-translational protein modification; positive regulation of gene expression; positive regulation of epithelial to mesenchymal transition; positive regulation of cardiac neural crest cell migration involved in outflow tract morphogenesis; regulation of signaling receptor activity; positive regulation of cell population proliferation; negative regulation of gene expression; negative regulation of pri-miRNA transcription by RNA polymerase II; regulation of apoptotic process; regulation of MAPK cascade; cell development; growth
Sources:Amigo / QuickGO
Orthologs
Databases	NCBI: entry; OMA: entry
Species	Human	Mouse
Entrez	652	12159
Ensembl	ENSG00000125378	ENSMUSG00000021835
UniProt	P12644	P21275
RefSeq (mRNA)	NM_001202; NM_130850; NM_130851	NM_007554; NM_001316360
RefSeq (protein)	NP_001193; NP_570911; NP_001334841; NP_001334842; NP_001334843 NP_001334844; NP_001334845; NP_001334846; NP_570912	NP_001303289; NP_031580
Location (UCSC)	n/a	Chr 14: 46.62 – 46.63 Mb
PubMed search
- Wikidata
View/Edit Human	View/Edit Mouse

Bone morphogenetic protein 4 is a protein that in humans is encoded by BMP4 gene. BMP4 is found on chromosome 14q22-q23.

BMP4 is a member of the bone morphogenetic protein family which is part of the transforming growth factor-beta superfamily. The superfamily includes large families of growth and differentiation factors. BMP4 is highly conserved evolutionarily. BMP4 is found in early embryonic development in the ventral marginal zone and in the eye, heart blood and otic vesicle.

== Discovery ==
Bone morphogenetic proteins were originally identified by an ability of demineralized bone extract to induce endochondral osteogenesis in vivo in an extraskeletal site.

== Gene ==
Bone Morphogenetic Protein 4 (BMP4) is a key signaling molecule belonging to the Transforming Growth Factor-beta (TGFβ) superfamily. BMP4 functions as a morphogen, a type of signal that governs the pattern of tissue development by inducing different cellular responses. This gene is fundamental to epithelial-mesenchymal interactions, which are the reciprocal communications between different tissue layers that drive the formation of complex organs. BMP4 is primarily involved in patterning the mammalian tooth germ and limb buds. In the developing tooth, BMP4 expressed in the mesenchyme acts as an essential feedback signal that maintains the expression of other master regulators. Other master regulators may include Sonic hedgehog (Shh) and Bmp2. However, this regulation is concentration-dependent. This means that while normal levels are required for maintenance, concentrations significantly above endogenous levels can contradictorily repress Shh and Bmp2. The biological importance of BMP4 is evidenced by genetic and inhibitory studies. In Msx1 mutant mice, tooth development is arrested at the "bud stage" because the loss of the Msx1 gene leads to a dramatic down regulation of mesenchymal BMP4. Additionally, in the developing limb, BMP4 is responsible for restricting the domain of Shh. The domain possesses only half the normal dose of the protein, potentially leading to malformations. Natural inhibitors like noggin can block BMP4 activity, resulting in the total repression of these essential developmental markers.

== Structure ==
Yielding an active carboxy-terminal peptide of 116 residues, human bmp4 is initially synthesized as a forty percent residue preproprotein which is cleaved post translationally. BMP4 has seven residues which are conserved and glycosylated. The monomers are held with disulphide bridges and 3 pairs of cysteine amino acids. This conformation is called a "cystine knot". BMP4 can form homodimers or heterodimers with similar BMPS. One example of this is BMP7. This ability to form homodimers or heterodimers gives the ability to have greater osteoinductive activity than just bmp4 alone. Not much is known yet about how BMPS interact with the extracellular matrix. As well little is known about the pathways which then degrade BMP4.

== Function ==
BMP4 is a polypeptide belonging to the TGF-β superfamily of proteins. Like other bone morphogenetic proteins (BMPs), it is critical for bone and cartilage development, including roles in tooth and limb formation and fracture repair. BMP4 is particularly important for initiating endochondral ossification in humans, and is also involved in muscle development, bone mineralization, and ureteric bud formation. It stimulates differentiation of ectodermal tissue, and drives osteoblastic differentiation of mesenchymal stem cells.

=== Embryogenesis ===
==== Axis formation and mesoderm patterning ====
During embryogenesis, BMP4 is essential for dorsal–ventral axis specification and mesoderm patterning. In Xenopus, BMP4 induces ventral mesoderm and suppresses neural fate by promoting epidermal differentiation. In mice, loss of BMP4 results in impaired mesoderm formation.

==== Neural Development ====
BMP4 plays a dorsalizing role in neural tube patterning, acting with BMP7 from the roof plate to specify dorsal interneurons and counteract Sonic hedgehog (Shh) signaling from the floor plate. It also contributes to neural crest cell apoptosis in the hindbrain region.

==== Somites and cartilage ====
BMP4 is involved in somite patterning and promotes cartilage development by inducing the expression of Msx1 and Msx2 genes in the somatic mesoderm.

==== Organogenesis ====
BMP4 plays key roles in the development of multiple organs. In Limb buds, BMP4 is expressed in interdigital mesenchyme, where it prevents apoptosis and contributes to digit separation. In teeth, it induces transcription factors Msx1 and Msx2 to specify incisor identity. Kidneys and urinary tract: BMP4 promotes ureteric bud branching and ureter differentiation. In lung and liver: BMP4 expression contributes to early organ specification and branching morphogenesis.

==== Stem cell differentiation ====
BMP4 synergizes with FGF2 to promote pluripotent stem cell differentiation into mesodermal lineages, enhancing osteogenic and chondrogenic outcomes. Together, BMP4 and FGF2 can also direct differentiation toward thyroid progenitor cells.

=== Adult ===
==== Nervous System ====
In the adult brain, BMP4 regulates ongoing neurogenesis in the dentate gyrus and subventricular zone (SVZ): In the dentate gyrus, BMP4 maintains neural stem cells in a quiescent state via BMPR-IA signaling.

In the SVZ, BMP4 promotes neuronal over oligodendroglial lineage commitment via Smad4 signaling and works with Tis21/BTG2 to promote terminal neuronal differentiation.

==== Metabolism and adipose tissue ====
BMP4 plays metabolic roles by regulating adipogenesis. It promotes differentiation of white adipocytes. It induces UCP1 expression in brown adipose tissue, supporting non-shivering thermogenesis.

==== Reproductive system ====
In the ovary, BMP4 (in conjunction with BMP7) supports early folliculogenesis and promotes the survival of primordial follicles.

=== Birds ===
In Darwin's finches, variation in BMP4 expression during beak development contributes to differences in beak size and shape, demonstrating its evolutionary role in morphological diversity.

=== Signal transduction ===
BMP4, as a member of the transforming growth factor-β (TGF-β) family binds to 2 different types of serine-threonine kinase receptors known as BMPR1 and BMPR2. Signal transduction via these receptors occurs via Smad and map kinase pathways to effect transcription of its target genes. In order for signal transduction to occur, both receptors must be functional. BMP is able to bind to BMPR2 without BMPR1 however, the affinity significantly increases in the presence of both receptors. BMPR1 is transphosphorylated via BMPR2 which induces downstream signalling within the cell, affecting transcription.

==== Smad signaling pathway ====
TGF-β family receptors most commonly use the Smad signaling pathway to tranduce signals. Type 2 receptors are responsible for activating type 1 receptors where their function involves the phosphorylation of R-Smads (Smad-1, Smad-5, Smad-8). Upon phosphorylation, formation of an R-SMAD complex in conjunction with common-partner Smad (co-Smad) occurs where it migrates to the nucleus. This signaling pathway is regulated by the small molecule inhibitor known as dorsomorphin which prevents the downstream effects of R-smads.

==== Map kinase (MAPK) signaling pathways ====
Mitogen activated protein kinases (MAPK) undergo phosphorylation via a signaling cascade where MAPKKK phosphorylates and activates MAPKK and MAPKK phosphorylates and activates MAPK which then induces an intracellular response. Activation of MAPKKK is through the interaction of mainly GTPases or another group of protein kinases. TGF-β receptors induce the MAPK signaling pathways of ERK, JNK and p38. BMP4 is also known to activate the ERK, JNK and p38 MAPK signalling pathways whilst have been found to act independently of Smad signaling pathways, are mostly active in conjunction with Smad. The activation of the ERK and JNK pathways acts to phosphorylate Smad and therefore regulate its activation. In addition to this, MAPK pathways may be able to directly affect Smad-interacting transcription factors via a JNK or p38 substrate that induces convergence of the two signaling pathways. This convergence is noted to consist mainly of cooperative behavior however, there is evidence to suggest that they may at times counteract each other. Furthermore, the balance that exists between the direct activation of these signaling pathways has a significant effect on TGF-β induced cellular responses.

Generation-of-Trophoblast-Stem-Cells-from-Rabbit-Embryonic-Stem-Cells-with-BMP4-pone.0017124.s005

== Inhibition ==
Inhibition of the BMP4 signal (by chordin, noggin, or follistatin) causes the ectoderm to differentiate into the neural plate. If these cells also receive signals from FGF, they will differentiate into the spinal cord; in the absence of FGF the cells become brain tissue.

While overexpression of BMP4 expression can lead to ventralization, inhibition with a dominant negative may result in complete dorsalization of the embryo or the formation of two axes.

Mice in which BMP4 was completely inactivated usually died during gastrulation. It is thought that inactivation of human BMP4 would likely have the same effect. However, mutations which do not entirely inactivate BMP4 in humans can also have subtle effects phenotypically, and have been implicated in tooth agenesis as well as osteoporosis.

== Clinical significance ==
Increase in expression of BMP4 has been associated with a variety of bone diseases, including the heritable disorder Fibrodysplasia Ossificans Progressiva.

There is strong evidence from sequencing studies of candidate genes involved in clefting that mutations in the bone morphogenetic protein 4 (BMP4) gene may be associated in the pathogenesis of cleft lip and palate.

=== Eye development ===
Eyes are essential for organisms, especially terrestrial vertebrates, to observe prey and obstacles; this is critical for their survival. The formation of the eyes starts as optic vesicles and lens derived from the neuroectoderm. Bone morphogenic proteins are known to stimulate eye lens formation. During early development of eyes, the formation of the optic vesicle is essential in Mice and BMP4 expressed strongly in the optic vesicle and weakly in the surrounding mesenchyme and surface ectoderm. This concentration gradient of BMP4 in optic vesicle is critical for lens induction. Researcher, Dr. Furuta and Dr. Hogan found out that if they did a laser mutation on mice embryos and causing a BMP4 homozygous null mutation, this embryo will not develop the lens. They also did an in situ hybridization of the BMP4 gene showing green color and Sox2 gene in red which they thought it was involved in the lens formation as well. After they did these two in situ hybridizations in the mice embryos, they found that both green and red colors are found in the optic vesicle of the mice embryos. This indicated that BMP4 and Sox2 are expressed in the right place at the right time of the optic vesicle and prove that they have some essential functions for the lens induction. Furthermore, they did a follow-up experiment that by injecting BMP4 into the BMP4 homozygous mutant embryos rescued the lens formation (12). This indicated that BMP4 is definitely required for lens formation. However, researchers also found that some of the mutated mice cannot be rescued. They later found that those mutants lacked of Msx 2 which is activated by BMP4. The mechanism they predicted was that BMP4 will active Msx 2 in the optic vesicle and concentration combination of BMP4 and Msx2 together active Sox2 and the Sox2 is essential for lens differentiation.

Injection of Noggin into lens fiber cells in mice significantly reduces the BMP4 proteins in the cells. This indicates that Noggin is sufficient to inhibit the production of BMP4. Moreover, another inhibitor protein, Alk6 was found that blocked the BMP4 from activating the Msx2 which stopped lens differentiation . However, there are still a lot of unknown about the mechanism of inhibition on BMP4 and downstream regulation of Sox2. In the future, researchers are aiming to find out a more complete pathway of whole eye development and hoping one day, they can find a way to cure some genetic caused eye diseases.

=== Hair loss ===
Hair loss or known as alopecia is caused from the changing of hair follicle morphology and hair follicle cycling in an abnormal fashion. The cycles of hair follicles are that of growth, or anagen, regression or catagen, and rest or telogen. In mammals reciprocal epithelial and mesenchymal interactions control the development of hair. Genes such as BMP4 and BMP2 are both active within the precursors of the hair shaft. Specifically BMP4 is found in the dermal papilla. BMP4 is part of the signaling network which controls the development of hair. It is needed for the induction of biochemical pathways and signaling for regulating the differentiation of the hair shaft in the anagen hair follicle. This is done through controlling the expression of the transcription factors which regulate hair differentiation. It is still unclear however where BMPs act within the genetic network. The signaling of bmp4 may potentially control expression of terminal differentiation molecules such as keratins. Other regulators have been shown to control hair follicle development as well. HOXC13 and FOXN1 are considered important regulators because loss-of-function experiments show impaired hair shaft differentiation that doesn't interfere in the hair follicle formation.

When BMP4 is expressed ectopically, within transgenic mice the hair follicle outer root sheath (ORS) the proliferation of the cell matrix is inhibited. BMP4 also activates hair keratin gene expression noting that BMP4 is important in the differentiation of the hair shaft. Noggin, a known inhibitor of BMP4, is found within the matrix cells of the hair bulb. Other important factors to consider in the development of hair is the expression of Shh (sonic hedgehog), BMP7, BMP2, WNT, and β-catenin as these are required in early stage morphogenesis.

Other genes which can inhibit or interact with BMP4 are noggin, follistatin, gremlin, which is all expressed in the developing hair follicles. In mice in which noggin is lacking, there are fewer hair follicles than on a normal mouse and the development of the follicle is inhibited. In chick embryos it is shown that ectopically expressed noggin produces enlarged follicles, and BMP4 signaling shows repressed placode fate in nearby cells. Noggin has also been shown during in vivo experiments to induce hair growth in post natal skin.

BMP4 is an important component of the biological pathways that involved regulating hair shaft differentiation within the anagen hair follicle. The strongest levels of expressed BMP4 are found within the medulla, hair shaft cells, distal hair matrix, and potential precursors of the cuticle. The two main methods which BMP4 inhibit expression of hair is through restricting growth factor expression in the hair matrix and antagonism between growth and differentiation signaling.

Pathways that regulate hair follicle formation and hair growth are key in developing therapeutic methods for hair loss conditions. Such conditions include the development of new follicles, changing the shape of characteristics of existing follicles, and the altering of hair growth in existing hair follicles. Furthermore, BMP4 and the pathway through which it works may provide therapeutic targets for the prevention of hair loss.
