= Malur R. Narasimha Prasad =

Indian Politician

M.R.N. Prasad
- on his 60th birthday in 1983
- Born: 1 May 1923; Bangalore, Karnataka
- Died: 7 October 1987 (aged 64); Bangalore, Karnataka
- Occupations: Endocrinologist, Professor

Malur R. Narasimha Prasad or M.R.N. Prasad (1 May 1923 – 7 October 1987) was an Indian Endocrinologist and Professor, known for his research in the field of reproductive physiology and the regulation of fertility. His major contributions were in the areas of comparative endocrinology, the regulation of male fertility, and the use of non-human primates in biomedical research.

He was the Founder of the International Society of Andrology, a member of the Research Committee of the International Planned Parenthood Federation (1964–1975), and was associated with the Special Program of Research, Development and Research Training in Human Reproduction at the World Health Organization in Geneva, Switzerland (1977–1983). At a national level, he worked closely with the Indian Council of Medical Research and the Ministry of Health, Government of India in research on human reproduction and family planning programs in India.

== Career ==
M.R.N. Prasad began his career as a lecturer in Zoology at Central College, Bangalore, University of Mysore in 1945. In 1955, he was awarded a Fulbright Fellowship and began doctoral studies at the University of Wisconsin.

From 1959 to 1977, he was Professor of Zoology at the University of Delhi, where he established a research group in the Department of Zoology that was recognized internationally in reproductive physiology.

During this period, he assumed advisory roles at the national level. He was a member of the National Coordination Committee of the Ministry of Health and Family Welfare, Government of India (1972–77); Member of the Expert Committee on Biomedical Research of the Indian Council of Medical Research (1971–1973); and Chairman of the Research Committee, Biology Division of the National Institute of Health and Family Welfare (1971–1975).

From 1977 to 1983, he worked with the Special Programme of Research, Development and Research Training in Human Reproduction at the World Health Organization in Geneva, Switzerland. At this time, he was also involved in the coordination of research and research training at the All India Institute of Medical Sciences in New Delhi, the Institute for Research Reproduction in Bombay, and the Indian Institute of Science in Bangalore.

== Students ==
Hari Reddi was a graduate student of Professor Prasad from 1963 to 1966.

== Books edited ==
Progress in Comparative Endocrinology: General and Comparative Endocrinology. Suppl.2. Proceedings of the V International Symposium on Comparative Endocrinology held in New Delhi, 1967. Ed. M.R.N. Prasad, Academic Press, New York, 1969.

Control of Fertility in the Male, J. Reprod. Fertil. Suppl.2. Proceedings of the Fifth Biological Workshop: International Planned Parenthood Federation, held in New Delhi, Eds. M.R.N. Prasad and J.P. Porter, Blackwell, London, 1976.

Use of Non-human Primates in Biomedical Research. Proceedings of an International Meeting held in New Delhi, 1975. Eds. M.R.N. Prasad and T.C. Anand Kumar, Indian National Science Academy and the Delhi University Press, 1976.

== Awards ==
- 1955 Fulbright Fellowship, USA (1955–1958)
- 1958 Knapp Centre Fellow: University of Wisconsin, USA
- 1973 Federation of Indian Chambers of Commerce and Industry, (FICCl) Award for Outstanding Research in Science and Technology
- 1974 National Family Planning Award. Ministry of Health and Family Planning, Government of India
- 1975 Jagdish Chandra Bose Award for Research in Life Sciences, Hari Om Ashram Trust and the University of Grants Commission
- 1975 Indian Academy of Sciences, Elected Member
- 1975 National Lecturer in Zoology, University Grants Commission
- 1983 Shantha Rao Memorial Oration. Institute for Research in Reproduction and Indian Council of Medical Research
