= GDF6 =

Protein-coding gene in the species Homo sapiens

Identifiers
- Aliases: GDF6, BMP-13, BMP13, CDMP2, KFM, KFS, KFS1, KFSL, LCA17, MCOP4, MCOPCB6, SCDO4, SGM1, growth differentiation factor 6, SYNS4
- External IDs: OMIM: 601147; MGI: 95689; HomoloGene: 40883; GeneCards: GDF6; OMA:GDF6 - orthologs

Gene location (Human)
Chr.	Chromosome 8 (human)
Band	8q22.1	Start	96,142,333 bp
Band	8q22.1	End	96,160,806 bp

Gene location (Mouse)
Chr.	Chromosome 4 (mouse)
Band	4|4 A1	Start	9,844,372 bp
Band	4|4 A1	End	9,862,345 bp
RNA expression pattern
Bgee	Human / Mouse (ortholog); Top expressed in: placenta; gonad; ventricular zone; gallbladder; right auricle of heart; gastric mucosa; right coronary artery; Achilles tendon; smooth muscle tissue; left coronary artery / Top expressed in: auditory ossicle; stapes; incus; malleus; ganglion; embryo; Jacobson's organ; sensory ganglion; genital tubercle; trigeminal ganglion; More reference expression data
BioGPS	n/a
Gene ontology
Molecular function	cytokine activity; protein homodimerization activity; transforming growth factor beta receptor binding; growth factor activity; protein binding
Cellular component	extracellular region; extracellular space
Biological process	regulation of apoptotic process; apoptotic process; pathway-restricted SMAD protein phosphorylation; retinal cell apoptotic process; regulation of MAPK cascade; cell development; positive regulation of pathway-restricted SMAD protein phosphorylation; BMP signaling pathway; positive regulation of transcription, DNA-templated; multicellular organism development; positive regulation of chondrocyte differentiation; positive regulation of neuron differentiation; activin receptor signaling pathway; SMAD protein signal transduction; positive regulation of p38MAPK cascade; fat cell differentiation; regulation of signaling receptor activity
Sources:Amigo / QuickGO
Orthologs
Species	Human	Mouse
Entrez	392255	242316
Ensembl	ENSG00000156466	ENSMUSG00000051279
UniProt	Q6KF10	P43028
RefSeq (mRNA)	NM_001001557	NM_013526
RefSeq (protein)	NP_001001557	NP_038554
Location (UCSC)	Chr 8: 96.14 – 96.16 Mb	Chr 4: 9.84 – 9.86 Mb
PubMed search
- Wikidata
View/Edit Human	View/Edit Mouse

Growth differentiation factor 6 (GDF6) is a protein that in humans is encoded by the GDF6 gene.

== Function ==
GDF6 belongs to the transforming growth factor beta superfamily and may regulate patterning of the ectoderm by interacting with bone morphogenetic proteins, and control eye development.

Growth differentiation factor 6 (GDF6) is a regulatory protein associated with growth and differentiation of developing embryos. GDF6 is encoded by the GDF6 gene. It is a member the transforming growth factor beta superfamily which is a group of proteins involved in early regulation of cell growth and development. GDF6 has been shown to play an important role in the patterning of the epidermis and bone and joint formation. GDF6 induces genes related to the development of the epidermis and can bind directly to noggin, a gene that controls neural development, to block its effect. GDF6 interacts with bone morphogenetic proteins (BMPs) to form heterodimers that may work to regulate neural induction and patterning in developing embryos. By developing a GDF6 knockout model, scientists repressed expression of GDF6 in developing mice embryos. Through this experiment, the scientists were able to directly link GDF6 with several skull and vertebral joint disorders, such as scoliosis and chondrodysplasia, Grebe type.
