= Metabologen =

Morphogen that can maintain metabolism and homeostasis

A metabologen is defined as a morphogen (molecule) that can initiate, promote and maintain metabolism and homeostasis. Based on this definition, bone morphogenetic proteins (BMPs) are metabologens, since they are involved in iron homeostasis, brown fat adipogenesis and energy metabolism. Professor A. Hari Reddi and Anand Reddi in Cytokine Growth Factor Rev were the first to propose the term metabologen (as reviewed in a special issue of Cytokine Growth Factor Review guest edited by Dr. A. Hari Reddi entitled Bone Morphogenetic Proteins, Stem Cells and Regenerative Medicine).
