= A. Hari Reddi =

American professor (born 1942)

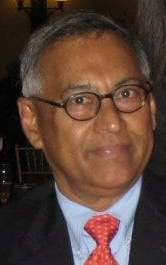
- Born: A. Hari Reddi; October 20, 1942 (age 84); Madras, Madras State, British India (now Chennai, Tamil Nadu, India)
- Education: University of Delhi
- Occupation: Biologist
- Known for: Bone morphogenetic protein Extracellular matrix Tissue Engineering
- Awards: Marshall R. Urist Award
- Scientific career
- Workplaces: University of California; Johns Hopkins University; National Institutes of Health; University of Chicago

A. Hari Reddi (born October 20, 1942) is a University of California Distinguished Professor and inaugural holder of the Lawrence J. Ellison Endowed Chair in Musculoskeletal Molecular Biology at the University of California, Davis. His research played an indispensable role in the identification, isolation and purification of bone morphogenetic proteins (BMPs) that are involved in bone formation and repair.

The molecular mechanism of bone induction studied by Professor Reddi led to the conceptual advance in tissue engineering that morphogens in the form of metabologens bound to an insoluble extracellular matrix scaffolding act in collaboration to stimulate stem cells to form cartilage and bone. The Reddi laboratory has also made important discoveries unraveling the role of the extracellular matrix in bone and cartilage tissue regeneration and repair.

Professor Reddi was previously the Virginia M. and William A. Percy Chair and Professor in Orthopaedic Surgery, Professor of Biological Chemistry, and Professor of Oncology at the Johns Hopkins University School of Medicine. He was also a past faculty member at the University of Chicago and senior scientist at the National Institutes of Health.

== Research ==
Professor Reddi discovered that bone induction is a sequential multistep cascade involving chemotaxis, mitosis, and differentiation. Early studies in his laboratory at the University of Chicago and National Institutes of Health unraveled the sequence of events involved in bone matrix-induce bone morphogenesis. Using a battery of in vitro and in vivo bioassays for bone formation, a systematic study was undertaken in his laboratory to isolate and purify putative bone morphogenetic proteins. Reddi and colleagues were the first to identify BMPs as pleiotropic regulators, acting in a concentration dependent manner. They demonstrated first that BMPs bind the extracellular matrix, are present at the apical ectodermal ridge in the developing limb bud, are chemotactic for human monocytes, and have neurotropic potential. His laboratory pioneered the use of BMPs in regenerative orthopedics and dentistry.

Professor Reddi's h-index is 109 with over 300 peer-reviewed manuscripts.

== Education and Mentors ==
Hari Reddi received his PhD from the University of Delhi in reproductive endocrinology under the mentorship of M.R.N. Prasad. Reddi did postdoctoral work with Howard Guy Williams-Ashman at the Johns Hopkins University School of Medicine. Reddi was also a student of Charles Brenton Huggins, the winner of the 1966 Nobel Prize with Peyton Rous for the endocrine regulation of cancer.

== International Conference of Bone Morphogenetic Proteins ==
Reddi is the founder of the International Conference on Bone Morphogenetic Proteins (BMPs). He organized the first conference at the Johns Hopkins University School of Medicine in 1994. The conference is held every two years rotating between the United States and an international venue.

== Awards and honors ==
- 1991 Elizabeth Winston Lanier Award Kappa Delta Award by American Academy of Orthopaedic Surgeons
- 1997 Inaugural winner of the Marshall Urist Award by the Orthopedic Research Society
- 1998 The Guy F. Lipscomb, Senior Lecture in Chemistry and Biochemistry at the University of South Carolina.
- 1999 Nicolas Andry Lifetime Achievement Award by The Association of Bone and Joint Surgeons
- 2015 Elected Member of the National Academy of Inventors
