= Daf-5 =

Protein-coding gene in the species Caenorhabditis elegans

Dauer Formation abnormality gene 5

Identifiers
- Organism: Caenorhabditis elegans
- Symbol: Daf-5
- Entrez: 175054
- RefSeq (mRNA): NM_064540.5
- RefSeq (Prot): NP_496941.1
- UniProt: G5EDM7

Other data
- Chromosome: II: 14.03 - 14.04 Mb
Search for
- Structures: Swiss-model
- Domains: InterPro

Daf-5 is an ortholog of the mammalian protein Sno/Ski，which present in the nematode worm Caenorhabditis elegans on the downstream of TGFβ signaling pathway. Without daf-7 signal, daf-5 combined with daf-3, co-SMAD for C. elegans, to form a heterodimer and started dauer development.
