= Noggin (protein) =

Protein-coding gene in the species Homo sapiens

NOG
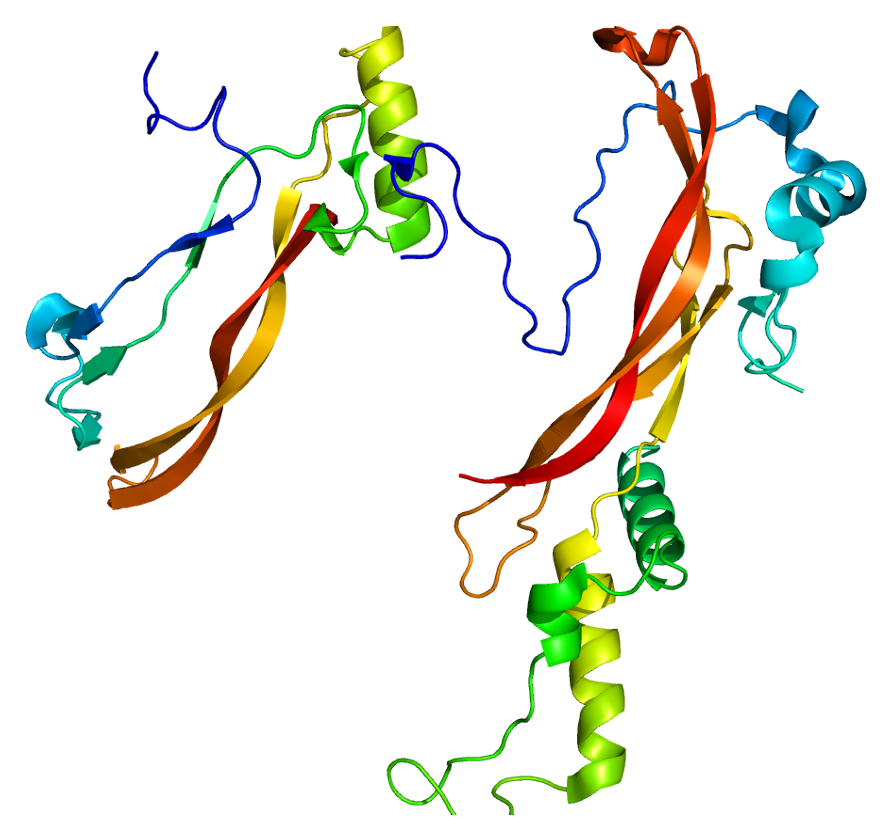

Identifiers
- Aliases: NOG, Nog, SYM1, SYNS1, SYNS1A, noggin
- External IDs: OMIM: 602991; MGI: 104327; GeneCards: NOG
Available structures
PDB	Ortholog search: PDBe RCSB
PDB	List of PDB id codes 1M4U

Gene location (Human)
Chr.	Chromosome 17 (human)
Band	17q22	Start	56,593,699 bp
Band	17q22	End	56,595,611 bp

Gene location (Mouse)
Chr.	Chromosome 11 (mouse)
Band	11 C|11 54.34 cM	Start	89,191,464 bp
Band	11 C|11 54.34 cM	End	89,193,158 bp
RNA expression pattern
Bgee	Human / Mouse (ortholog); Top expressed in: retinal pigment epithelium; buccal mucosa cell; testicle; gonad; ventricular zone; ganglionic eminence; decidua; canal of the cervix; nucleus accumbens; stromal cell of endometrium / Top expressed in: notochord; neural groove; neural fold; ventricular zone; phalanx of second toe; muscle of thigh; embryo; embryonic organizer; primary visual cortex; somite; More reference expression data
BioGPS	n/a
Gene ontology
Molecular function	protein homodimerization activity; protein binding; cytokine binding
Cellular component	extracellular region; extracellular space
Biological process	positive regulation of glomerulus development; pattern specification process; axial mesoderm development; skeletal system development; cell differentiation; ureteric bud development; negative regulation of astrocyte differentiation; pituitary gland development; positive regulation of branching involved in ureteric bud morphogenesis; lung morphogenesis; negative regulation of cartilage development; somatic stem cell population maintenance; fibroblast growth factor receptor signaling pathway involved in neural plate anterior/posterior pattern formation; positive regulation of epithelial cell proliferation; negative regulation of cytokine activity; neural plate morphogenesis; negative regulation of cell differentiation; anatomical structure formation involved in morphogenesis; mesoderm formation; negative regulation of apoptotic signaling pathway; embryonic digit morphogenesis; cellular response to BMP stimulus; wound healing; in utero embryonic development; BMP signaling pathway; negative regulation of gene expression; somite development; negative regulation of osteoblast differentiation; embryonic skeletal system development; nervous system development; axon guidance; negative regulation of BMP signaling pathway; regulation of BMP signaling pathway; multicellular organism development; prostatic bud formation; limb development; central nervous system development; cartilage development; neural tube closure; brain development; negative regulation of cell migration; notochord morphogenesis; cell differentiation in hindbrain; mesenchymal cell differentiation; regulation of fibroblast growth factor receptor signaling pathway involved in neural plate anterior/posterior pattern formation; neural tube development; spinal cord development; ureteric bud formation; epithelial to mesenchymal transition; middle ear morphogenesis; embryonic skeletal joint morphogenesis; urogenital system development; endoderm formation; negative regulation of cardiac muscle cell proliferation; motor neuron axon guidance; dorsal/ventral pattern formation; negative regulation of canonical Wnt signaling pathway; face morphogenesis; positive regulation of transcription by RNA polymerase II; negative regulation of transcription by RNA polymerase II; osteoblast differentiation; membranous septum morphogenesis; outflow tract morphogenesis; endocardial cushion morphogenesis; ventricular compact myocardium morphogenesis; endoderm development; positive regulation of gene expression; atrial cardiac muscle tissue morphogenesis; negative regulation of pathway-restricted SMAD protein phosphorylation; ventricular septum morphogenesis; BMP signaling pathway involved in heart development; heart trabecula morphogenesis; pharyngeal arch artery morphogenesis; negative regulation of epithelial to mesenchymal transition involved in endocardial cushion formation
Sources:Amigo / QuickGO
Orthologs
Databases	NCBI: entry; OMA: entry
Species	Human	Mouse
Entrez	9241	18121
Ensembl	ENSG00000183691	ENSMUSG00000048616
UniProt	Q13253	P97466
RefSeq (mRNA)	NM_005450	NM_008711
RefSeq (protein)	NP_005441	NP_032737
Location (UCSC)	Chr 17: 56.59 – 56.6 Mb	Chr 11: 89.19 – 89.19 Mb
PubMed search
- Wikidata
View/Edit Human	View/Edit Mouse

Noggin, also known as NOG, is a protein that is involved in the development of many body tissues, including nerve tissue, muscles, and bones. In humans, noggin is encoded by the NOG gene. The amino acid sequence of human noggin is highly homologous to that of rat, mouse, and Xenopus (an aquatic frog genus).

Noggin is an inhibitor of several bone morphogenetic proteins (BMPs): it inhibits at least BMP2, 4, 5, 6, 7, 13, and 14.

The protein's name, which is a slang English-language word for "head", was coined in reference to its ability to produce embryos with large heads when exposed at high concentrations.

== Function ==
Noggin is a signaling molecule that plays an important role in promoting somite patterning in the developing embryo. It is released from the notochord and regulates bone morphogenic protein 4 (BMP4) during development. The absence of BMP4 will cause the patterning of the neural tube and somites from the neural plate in the developing embryo. It also causes formation of the head and other dorsal structures.

Noggin function is required for correct nervous system, somite, and skeletal development. Experiments in mice have shown that noggin also plays a role in learning, cognition, bone development, and neural tube fusion. Heterozygous missense mutations in the noggin gene can cause deformities such as joint fusions and syndromes such as multiple synostosis syndrome (SYNS1) and proximal symphalangism (SIM1). SYNS1 is different from SYM1 by causing hip and vertebral fusions. The embryo may also develop shorter bones, miss any skeletal elements, or lack multiple articulating joints.

Increased plasma levels of Noggin have been observed in obese mice and in patients with a body mass index over 27. Additionally, it has been shown that Noggin depletion in adipose tissue leads to obesity.

== Mechanism of action ==
The secreted polypeptide noggin, encoded by the NOG gene, binds and inactivates members of the transforming growth factor-beta (TGF-beta) superfamily signaling proteins, such as bone morphogenetic protein 4 (BMP4).

By diffusing through extracellular matrices more efficiently than members of the TGF-beta superfamily, noggin may have a principal role in creating morphogenic gradients. Noggin appears to have pleiotropic effects, both early in development and in later stages.

=== Knockout model ===
A study of a mouse knockout model tracked the extent to which the absence of noggin affected embryological development. The focus of the study was the formation of the ear and its role in conductive hearing loss. The inner ear underwent multiple deformations affecting the cochlear duct, semicircular canals, and otic capsule portions. Noggin's involvement in the malformations was also shown to be indirect, through its interaction with the notochord and neural axis. The kinking of the notochord and disorientation of the body axis results in a caudal shift in the embryonic body plan of the hindbrain. Major signaling molecules from the rhombomere structures in the hindbrain could not properly induce inner ear formation. This reflected noggin's regulating of BMP as the major source of deformation, rather than noggin directly affecting inner ear development.

Specific knockout models have been created using the Cre-lox system. A model knocking out Noggin specifically in adipocytes has allowed to elucidate that Noggin also plays a role in adipose tissue: its depletion in adipocytes causes alterations in the structure of both brown and white adipose tissue, along with brown fat dysfunction (impaired thermogenesis and β-oxidation) that results in dramatic increases of body weight and percent body fat that causes alterations in the lipid profile and in the liver; the effects vary with gender.

== Clinical significance ==
Noggin proteins play a role in germ layer-specific derivation of specialized cells. The formation of neural tissues, the notochord, hair follicles, and eye structures arise from the ectoderm germ layer. Noggin activity in the mesoderm gives way to the formation of cartilage, bone and muscle growth, and in the endoderm noggin is involved in the development of the lungs.

Early craniofacial development is heavily influenced by the presence of noggin, in accordance with its multiple tissue-specific requirements. Noggin influences the formation and growth of the palate, mandible and skull through its interaction with neural crest cells. Mice with a lack of NOG gene are shown to have an outgrowth of the mandible and a cleft palate. Another craniofacial related deformity due to the absence of noggin is conductive hearing loss caused by uncontrolled outgrowth of the cochlear duct and coiling.

Recently, several heterozygous missense human NOG mutations in unrelated families with proximal symphalangism (SYM1) and multiple synostoses syndrome (SYNS1) have been identified; both SYM1 and SYNS1 have multiple joint fusion as their principal feature, and map to the same region on chromosome 17 (17q22) as NOG. These mutations indicate functional haploinsufficiency where the homozygous forms are embryonically lethal.

All these NOG mutations have altered evolutionarily conserved amino acid residues.

Mutations in this gene have been associated with middle ear abnormalities.

== Discovery ==
Noggin was originally isolated from the aquatic-frog genus Xenopus. The discovery was based on the organism's ability to restore normal dorsal-ventral body axis in embryos that had been artificially ventralized by ultraviolet treatment. Noggin was discovered in the laboratory of Richard M. Harland and William C. Smith at the University of California, Berkeley because of this ability to induce secondary axis formation in frog embryos.
