= Charles Brenton Huggins =

Canadian-American physician and Nobel laureate (1901–1997)

- Huggins in 1966
- Born: September 22, 1901; Halifax, Nova Scotia, Canada
- Died: January 12, 1997 (aged 95); Chicago, Illinois, U.S.
- Citizenship: American
- Education: Acadia University; Harvard University
- Known for: prostate cancer hormones
- Awards: Nobel Prize for Physiology or Medicine (1966); Cameron Prize for Therapeutics of the University of Edinburgh (1956); Gairdner Foundation International Award (1966)
- Scientific career
- Fields: physiology
- Workplaces: University of Michigan, University of Chicago

Charles Brenton Huggins (September 22, 1901 – January 12, 1997) was a Canadian-American surgeon and physiologist known for his work on prostate function, prostate cancer, and breast cancer. Born in Halifax in 1901, Huggins moved to the United States for medical school. He was one of the founding staff members of the University of Chicago Medical School, where he remained for the duration of his professional research career. Huggins's work on how sex hormones influence prostate function ultimately led to his discovery of hormone therapies to treat prostate cancer. For this finding, he was awarded the 1966 Nobel Prize for Physiology or Medicine. In addition to his work on prostate cancer, Huggins explored the relationship between hormones and breast cancer, developed an animal model for breast cancer, and developed chromogenic substrates that are widely used for biochemical analyses. Huggins continued to perform research into his 90s; he died in Chicago in 1997.

== Early life and education ==
Charles Brenton Huggins was born September 22, 1901, in Halifax, Nova Scotia, to Charles E. Huggins and Bessie Maria Spencer. At 19, he graduated from Acadia University with a BA degree, supplementing his Acadia coursework with summer courses in physical and organic chemistry at Columbia University. Huggins went on to Harvard Medical School, and received his MD degree in 1924. He served his internship and residency in general surgery with Frederick A. Coller at the University of Michigan. While at Michigan, Huggins met operating room nurse Margaret Wellman; they married in 1927.

== Academic career ==
In 1927, Huggins was recruited to the new University of Chicago Medical School by chairman of surgery Dallas Phemister. As one of the eight original staff members of the school, Huggins was assigned to the urology department, and had to rapidly teach himself the specialty. In 1931, Phemister offered Huggins a paid research sabbatical in Europe; Huggins spent several months at London's Lister Institute working in Robert Robison's lab to deepen his knowledge in biochemistry. He was promoted to associate professor in 1933, and full professor in 1936.

In 1951, businessman and longtime financial supporter of Huggins's research Ben E. May endowed the Ben May Laboratory for Cancer Research at the University of Chicago. Huggins eventually became the May Laboratory's director, serving in the position until 1969. In 1962, he was granted an endowed professorship, the William B. Ogden Distinguished Service Professor.

Students of Professor Huggins included Howard Guy Williams-Ashman, Shutsung Liao, Paul Talalay and A. Hari Reddi.

== Research ==
A plaque in Professor's Huggins office carried his motto: "Discovery is our business." This motto signified his ethos to research and medical discovery.

Huggins's early research work focused on bone physiology. However, he eventually felt this bone work was unlikely to lead to medical progress, and set it aside in favor of studying the male urogenital tract. Through the 1930s, Huggins published work characterizing the constituents of semen and which organ (seminal vesicles or prostate) they derive from. In 1939, Huggins described a method for isolating prostate fluid from dogs, which served as the foundation for much of his subsequent work. He showed that the prostate requires androgens (male sex hormones) in order to function, and that androgen treatment could be counteracted by treatment with estrogens. In the course of this work, he discovered that older dogs tended to have enlarged prostates, and that these enlarged prostates could be shrunk by administering estrogen.

In 1940 and 1941, Huggins – along with students Clarence V. Hodges and William Wallace Scott – published a series of three papers detailing his most famous finding: that counteracting androgen activity by orchiectomy (surgical removal of the testicles) or estrogen treatment shrank tumors in many men with metastatic prostate cancer. These men experienced dramatic pain relief within days of the treatment; four of the original 21 treated went on to survive more than 12 years from the original treatment.

Huggins's work on prostate cancer often necessitated measuring the amount of prostate-derived enzymes in the blood. To this end, Huggins developed colorimetric methods for quantifying the concentration of various phosphatases, glucuronidases, and esterases. These assays relied on chromogenic substrates (substances that change color in response to a given enzyme), a term Huggins coined, and a concept he pioneered.

In the 1950s, Huggins went on to show an analogous relationship between sex hormones and breast cancer – tumor growth was stimulated by estrogens, and slowed by androgens. At the time breast cancer research was hindered by the lack of an animal model. Huggins described the first reliable model: 7,12-dimethylbenz(a)anthracene administered orally to rats, 100% of which rapidly developed breast tumors; the model is now called Huggins's tumor. Around this time, Huggins wound down his surgical practice, turning his attention to full-time scientific research.

Huggins published over 200 peer-reviewed papers describing his research.

== Honours ==
Huggins was elected to the United States National Academy of Sciences and the American Academy of Arts and Sciences in 1949. In 1962, he was elected to the American Philosophical Society, and was awarded the Lasker Award the following year. In 1966, following nominations from noted surgeon J. Hartwell Harrison as well as Nobel laureates Otto H. Warburg, William P. Murphy, and Albert Szent-Györgyi, Huggins was awarded the Nobel Prize in Physiology or Medicine "for his discoveries concerning hormonal treatment of prostatic cancer". From 1972 to 1979, Huggins was named the ceremonial chancellor of his alma mater, Acadia University. His prize, shared with fellow cancer researcher Peyton Rous, was just the second Nobel for cancer treatment or research.

== Personal life ==
Huggins and his wife Margaret had a son and a daughter. His son, Charles E. Huggins, was also a surgeon, and directed the Massachusetts General Hospital blood bank until his death in 1990. Margaret Huggins died in 1983. Huggins devoted much of his time to laboratory work, logging long hours in the lab, and continuing to perform hands-on laboratory work in his 90s. Huggins died on January 12, 1997, in Chicago, Illinois, aged 95.
