= Marshall R. Urist =

American orthopedic surgeon

Marshall R. Urist (1914 – 2001) was an American orthopedic surgeon working at University of California, Los Angeles. He was best known for his discovery in 1965 of bone morphogenic protein.

Urist's 1965 Science paper is one of the highest cited papers in the bone tissue engineering space with over 8500 citations and inspired work by Hari Reddi and the biotech industry to purify and eventually clone bone morphogenetic proteins. Dr. Urist first proposed the name "Bone Morphogenetic Protein" in the scientific literature in the Journal of Dental Research in 1971.

The Orthopaedic Research Society has given a Marshall R. Urist Award every year since 1997.
