= GDF11 =

Protein-coding gene in humans

Available structures
PDB	Ortholog search: PDBe RCSB
PDB	List of PDB id codes 5E4G

Identifiers
- Aliases: GDF11, BMP-11, BMP11, growth differentiation factor 11, VHO
- External IDs: OMIM: 603936; MGI: 1338027; HomoloGene: 21183; GeneCards: GDF11; OMA:GDF11 - orthologs

Gene location (Human)
Chr.	Chromosome 12 (human)
Band	12q13.2	Start	55,743,122 bp
Band	12q13.2	End	55,757,264 bp

Gene location (Mouse)
Chr.	Chromosome 10 (mouse)
Band	10|10 D3	Start	128,718,164 bp
Band	10|10 D3	End	128,727,587 bp
RNA expression pattern
Bgee	Human / Mouse (ortholog); Top expressed in: retinal pigment epithelium; internal globus pallidus; tendon of biceps brachii; ventral tegmental area; subthalamic nucleus; superior vestibular nucleus; vena cava; endothelial cell; pons; stromal cell of endometrium / Top expressed in: spinal ganglia; superior cervical ganglion; tail of embryo; upper arm; mesenchyme; genital tubercle; olfactory bulb; trigeminal ganglion; ureter; quadriceps femoris muscle; More reference expression data
BioGPS	n/a
Gene ontology
Molecular function	cytokine activity; transforming growth factor beta receptor binding; growth factor activity; protein binding
Cellular component	intracellular membrane-bounded organelle; nucleoplasm; extracellular region; extracellular space; cellular component; protein-containing complex
Biological process	regulation of apoptotic process; skeletal system development; roof of mouth development; ureteric bud development; regulation of MAPK cascade; spinal cord anterior/posterior patterning; cell development; negative regulation of cell differentiation; positive regulation of pathway-restricted SMAD protein phosphorylation; cell maturation; nervous system development; animal organ morphogenesis; pancreas development; mesoderm development; metanephros development; camera-type eye morphogenesis; anterior/posterior pattern specification; negative regulation of cell population proliferation; SMAD protein signal transduction; regulation of signaling receptor activity; negative regulation of neuron differentiation
Sources:Amigo / QuickGO
Orthologs
Species	Human	Mouse
Entrez	10220	14561
Ensembl	ENSG00000135414	ENSMUSG00000025352
UniProt	O95390	Q9Z1W4
RefSeq (mRNA)	NM_005811	NM_010272
RefSeq (protein)	NP_005802	NP_034402
Location (UCSC)	Chr 12: 55.74 – 55.76 Mb	Chr 10: 128.72 – 128.73 Mb
PubMed search
- Wikidata
View/Edit Human	View/Edit Mouse

Growth differentiation factor 11 (GDF11), also known as bone morphogenetic protein 11 (BMP-11), is a protein that in humans is encoded by the growth differentiation factor 11 gene. GDF11 is a member of the Transforming growth factor beta family.

GDF11 acts as a cytokine and its sequence is highly conserved between in humans, mice and rats. The bone morphogenetic protein group is characterized by a polybasic proteolytic processing site, which is cleaved to produce a protein containing seven conserved cysteine residues.

== Tissue distribution ==
GDF11 is expressed in many tissues, including skeletal muscle, pancreas, skin, kidney, nervous system, and retina.

== Function ==
Gene deletion and over-expression studies indicate that GDF11 primarily regulates the embryological development of the skeletal system. It may also help regulate development of the central nervous system, blood vessels, the kidney and other tissues.

GDF11 was initially reported to improve neurodegenerative and neurovascular disease outcomes, increase skeletal muscle volume, and enhances muscle strength. However, several groups then showed that over-expression of GDF11 causes muscle wasting. In retrospect, this is not surprising, since GDF11 is 90% identical to myostatin, a known inhibitor of muscle growth. GDF11 binds the same ActRIIA/B receptors, initiating phosphorylation of the SMAD2/3 transcription factors.

== Effects on cell growth and differentiation ==
GDF11 belongs to the transforming growth factor beta superfamily that controls anterior-posterior patterning by regulating the expression of Hox genes. It determines Hox gene expression domains and rostrocaudal identity in the caudal spinal cord.

During mouse development, GDF11 expression begins in the tail bud and caudal neural plate region. GDF knock-out mice display skeletal defects as a result of patterning problems with anterior-posterior positioning. This cytokine also inhibits the proliferation of olfactory receptor neural progenitors to regulate the number of neurons in the olfactory epithelium, and controls the competence of progenitor cells to regulate numbers of retinal ganglionic cells developing in the retina. Other studies in mice suggest that GDF11 is involved in mesodermal formation and neurogenesis during embryonic development.

GDF11 can bind type I TGF-beta superfamily receptors ACVR1B (ALK4), TGFBR1 (ALK5) and ACVR1C (ALK7), but predominantly uses ALK4 and ALK5 for signal transduction. It is also closely related to myostatin, a negative regulator of muscle growth, both structurally and phylogenetically.

GDF11 is 90% structurally similar to myostatin. It was originally reported that GDF11 levels decline with age and exerts anti-aging regenerative effects in skeletal muscle in mice. However, it was later shown that the reagents used were non-selective, and the authors were measuring myostatin, not GDF11. GDF11 does not decline with age, and its downstream signaling mechanisms are similar to that of myostatin.

== Human studies ==
Elevian, a university spin-off company whose founders include Harvard Stem Cell Institute researchers Dr. Amy Wagers, Dr. Lee Rubin, and Dr. Rich Lee, has raised $58 million in two rounds of funding to study GDF11. On June 19, 2022, the New York Times published an article about GDF11 and Elevian titled "Can a 'Magic' Protein Slow the Aging Process?". The article stated that Elevian will conduct clinical trials using GDF11 to repair stroke damage in humans starting in Q1 of 2023.

GDF11 levels in individuals with major depressive disorder are significantly lower compared to healthy controls. Administration of GDF11 in aged mice stimulates neuronal autophagy which improves memory and alleviates senescence and depression-like symptoms in a neurogenesis-independent manner. flammation, which could be the cause higher GDF11 expression in colon cancer patients..
