= Daf-4 =

abnormal dauer formation protein 4

Identifiers
- Organism: Caenorhabditis elegans
- Symbol: daf-4
- Entrez: 175781
- HomoloGene: 124563
- UniProt: P50488

Other data
- Chromosome: III: 5.63 - 5.63 Mb
Search for
- Structures: Swiss-model
- Domains: InterPro

The DAF-4 gene encodes for the only type II receptor of TGF-beta signaling pathway in the worm Caenorhabditis elegans, with the ligands Daf-7 or Dbl-1. When binds to the ligand Daf-7, Daf-4 complexed with the type I receptor Daf-1, and activated the Smad Protein Daf-8/14. By contrast, when binds to Dbl-1, Daf-4 complexed with the Sma-6 type I receptor, and activated the Sma-2/3/4.
