= Bone morphogenetic protein 8B =

Protein found in humans

BMP8B

Identifiers
- Aliases: BMP8B, BMP8, OP2, bone morphogenetic protein 8b
- External IDs: OMIM: 602284; MGI: 104515; GeneCards: BMP8B

Gene location (Human)
Chr.	Chromosome 1 (human)
Band	1p34.2	Start	39,757,182 bp
Band	1p34.2	End	39,788,865 bp

Gene location (Mouse)
Chr.	Chromosome 4 (mouse)
Band	4 D2.2|4 57.42 cM	Start	123,206,438 bp
Band	4 D2.2|4 57.42 cM	End	123,237,045 bp
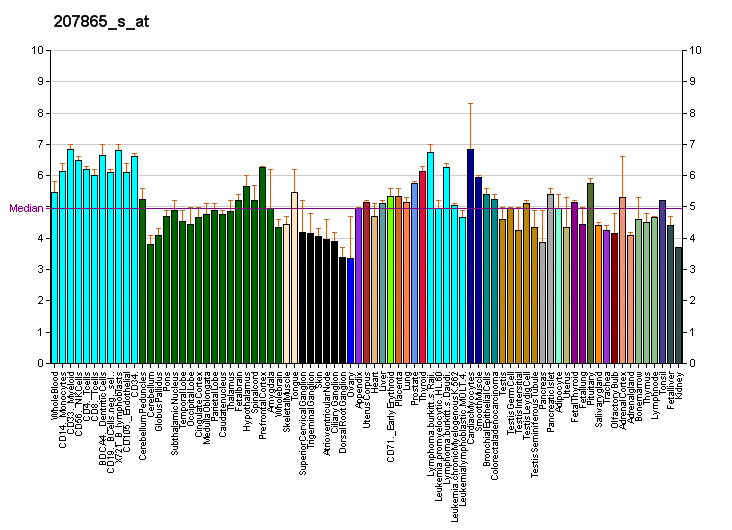
RNA expression pattern
Bgee	Human / Mouse (ortholog); Top expressed in: tibia; spinal ganglia; trigeminal ganglion; jejunal mucosa; tibial nerve; retinal pigment epithelium; sural nerve; trabecular bone; duodenum; mucosa of colon / Top expressed in: decidua; gastrula; intestinal villus; calvaria; hair follicle; molar; jejunum; embryo; Ileal epithelium; body of femur; More reference expression data
BioGPS	More reference expression data
Gene ontology
Molecular function	transforming growth factor beta receptor binding; cytokine activity; BMP receptor binding; growth factor activity
Cellular component	extracellular region; extracellular space
Biological process	regulation of apoptotic process; multicellular organism development; skeletal system development; positive regulation of pathway-restricted SMAD protein phosphorylation; cartilage development; cell differentiation; regulation of MAPK cascade; SMAD protein signal transduction; cell development; BMP signaling pathway; ossification; regulation of signaling receptor activity
Sources:Amigo / QuickGO
Orthologs
Databases	NCBI: entry; OMA: entry
Species	Human	Mouse
Entrez	656	12163
Ensembl	ENSG00000116985	ENSMUSG00000032726
UniProt	P34820	P34821
RefSeq (mRNA)	NM_001720	NM_001256019; NM_007558
RefSeq (protein)	NP_001711	NP_001242948; NP_031584
Location (UCSC)	Chr 1: 39.76 – 39.79 Mb	Chr 4: 123.21 – 123.24 Mb
PubMed search
- Wikidata
View/Edit Human	View/Edit Mouse

Bone morphogenetic protein 8B is a protein that in humans is encoded by the BMP8B gene.

The protein encoded by this gene is a member of the TGF-β superfamily. It has close sequence homology to BMP7 and BMP5 and is believed to play a role in bone and cartilage development. It has been shown to be expressed in the hippocampus of murine embryos.

The bone morphogenetic proteins (BMPs) are a family of secreted signaling molecules that can induce ectopic bone growth. Many BMPs are part of the transforming growth factor-beta (TGFB) superfamily. BMPs were originally identified by an ability of demineralized bone extract to induce endochondral osteogenesis in vivo in an extraskeletal site. Based on its expression early in embryogenesis, the BMP encoded by this gene has a proposed role in early development. In addition, the fact that this BMP is closely related to BMP5 and BMP7 has led to speculation of possible bone inductive activity.
