= Bone morphogenetic protein 5 =

Protein-coding gene in the species Homo sapiens

BMP5

Identifiers
- Aliases: BMP5, entrez:653, bone morphogenetic protein 5
- External IDs: OMIM: 112265; MGI: 88181; GeneCards: BMP5

Gene location (Human)
Chr.	Chromosome 6 (human)
Band	6p12.1	Start	55,753,653 bp
Band	6p12.1	End	55,875,590 bp

Gene location (Mouse)
Chr.	Chromosome 9 (mouse)
Band	9 D|9 42.34 cM	Start	75,682,646 bp
Band	9 D|9 42.34 cM	End	75,807,592 bp
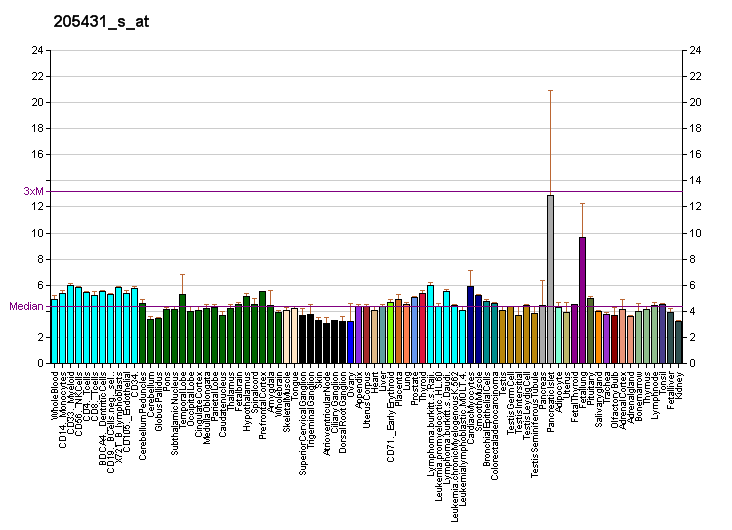

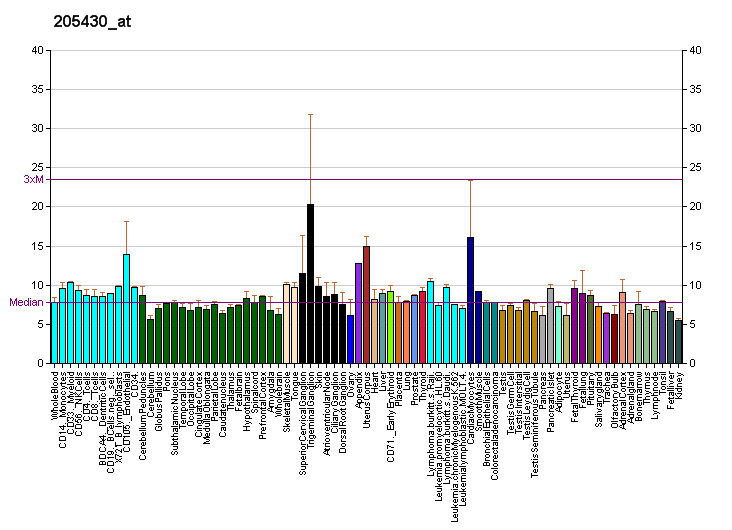
RNA expression pattern
Bgee	Human / Mouse (ortholog); Top expressed in: Achilles tendon; islet of Langerhans; cartilage tissue; tibia; placenta; Epithelium of choroid plexus; mucosa of urinary bladder; rectum; jejunal mucosa; right lung / Top expressed in: secondary oocyte; zygote; primary oocyte; vestibular sensory epithelium; left lung lobe; vestibular membrane of cochlear duct; Paneth cell; skin of external ear; carotid body; right lung; More reference expression data
BioGPS	More reference expression data
Gene ontology
Molecular function	cytokine activity; BMP receptor binding; transforming growth factor beta receptor binding; growth factor activity
Cellular component	extracellular region; extracellular space; vesicle; cellular component
Biological process	regulation of apoptotic process; pattern specification process; skeletal system development; cell differentiation; male genitalia development; regulation of MAPK cascade; SMAD protein signal transduction; ossification; positive regulation of epithelial cell proliferation; negative regulation of mononuclear cell migration; negative regulation of cortisol biosynthetic process; positive regulation of pathway-restricted SMAD protein phosphorylation; positive regulation of dendrite development; BMP signaling pathway; multicellular organism development; cartilage development; negative regulation of extrinsic apoptotic signaling pathway via death domain receptors; negative regulation of insulin-like growth factor receptor signaling pathway; type B pancreatic cell development; negative regulation of steroid biosynthetic process; negative regulation of epithelial to mesenchymal transition; positive regulation of transcription by RNA polymerase II; negative regulation of cell population proliferation; negative regulation of aldosterone biosynthetic process; endocardial cushion formation; pericardium morphogenesis; neural fold elevation formation; hindbrain development; cardiac muscle tissue development; pharyngeal system development; cardiac septum morphogenesis; chorio-allantoic fusion; heart trabecula morphogenesis; allantois development; regulation of signaling receptor activity; ear development; anterior head development; positive regulation of cell population proliferation; cell development; signal transduction
Sources:Amigo / QuickGO
Orthologs
Databases	NCBI: entry; OMA: entry
Species	Human	Mouse
Entrez	653	12160
Ensembl	ENSG00000112175	ENSMUSG00000032179
UniProt	P22003	P49003
RefSeq (mRNA)	NM_021073; NM_001329754; NM_001329756	NM_007555
RefSeq (protein)	NP_001316683; NP_001316685; NP_066551; NP_066551.1	NP_031581
Location (UCSC)	Chr 6: 55.75 – 55.88 Mb	Chr 9: 75.68 – 75.81 Mb
PubMed search
- Wikidata
View/Edit Human	View/Edit Mouse

Bone morphogenetic protein 5 is a protein that in humans is encoded by the BMP5 gene.

The protein encoded by this gene is member of the TGFβ superfamily. Bone morphogenetic proteins are known for their ability to induce bone and cartilage development. BMP5 may play a role in certain cancers. Like other BMP's BMP5 is inhibited by chordin and noggin. It is expressed in the trabecular meshwork and optic nerve head and may have a role in the development and normal function. It is also expressed in the lung and liver.

This gene encodes a member of the bone morphogenetic protein family which is part of the transforming growth factor-beta superfamily. The superfamily includes large families of growth and differentiation factors. Bone morphogenetic proteins were originally identified by an ability of demineralized bone extract to induce endochondral osteogenesis in vivo in an extraskeletal site. These proteins are synthesized as prepropeptides, cleaved, and then processed into dimeric proteins. This protein may act as an important signaling molecule within the trabecular meshwork and optic nerve head, and may play a potential role in glaucoma pathogenesis. This gene is differentially regulated during the formation of various tumors.
