= GDF1 =

Protein-coding gene in the species Homo sapiens

Identifiers
- Aliases: GDF1, DORV, DTGA3, RAI, growth differentiation factor 1, CHTD6, UOG1, LASS1, CERS1, LAG1
- External IDs: OMIM: 602880; MGI: 95683; HomoloGene: 105644; GeneCards: GDF1; OMA:GDF1 - orthologs

Gene location (Human)
Chr.	Chromosome 19 (human)
Band	19p13.11	Start	18,868,545 bp
Band	19p13.11	End	18,896,158 bp

Gene location (Mouse)
Chr.	Chromosome 8 (mouse)
Band	8|8 B3.3	Start	70,782,467 bp
Band	8|8 B3.3	End	70,784,237 bp
RNA expression pattern
Bgee	Human / Mouse (ortholog); Top expressed in: primary visual cortex; sural nerve; superior frontal gyrus; ganglionic eminence; skeletal muscle tissue; prefrontal cortex; muscle of thigh; sensory nervous system; sensory organ; face / Top expressed in: striatum of neuraxis; epiblast; embryo; embryo; superior frontal gyrus; lateral plate mesoderm; embryonic organizer; adrenal gland; notochord; cerebellar cortex; More reference expression data
BioGPS	n/a
Gene ontology
Molecular function	transforming growth factor beta receptor binding; cytokine activity; growth factor activity
Cellular component	extracellular region; extracellular space
Biological process	regulation of apoptotic process; positive regulation of pathway-restricted SMAD protein phosphorylation; regulation of MAPK cascade; SMAD protein signal transduction; cell development; BMP signaling pathway; regulation of signaling receptor activity
Sources:Amigo / QuickGO
Orthologs
Species	Human	Mouse
Entrez	2657	14559
Ensembl	ENSG00000130283	ENSMUSG00000109523
UniProt	P27539	P20863
RefSeq (mRNA)	NM_001492; NM_001387438	NM_001163282; NM_008107
RefSeq (protein)	NP_001483	NP_001156754; NP_032133
Location (UCSC)	Chr 19: 18.87 – 18.9 Mb	Chr 8: 70.78 – 70.78 Mb
PubMed search
- Wikidata
View/Edit Human	View/Edit Mouse

Growth differentiation factor 1 (GDF1) is a protein that in humans is encoded by the GDF1 gene.

GDF1 belongs to the transforming growth factor beta superfamily that has a role in left-right patterning and mesoderm induction during embryonic development. It is found in the brain, spinal cord and peripheral nerves of embryos.
