= Receptor protein serine/threonine kinase =

Class of enzymes

Identifiers
- Symbol: Receptor protein serine/threonine kinase
- Membranome: 1031

Receptor protein serine/threonine kinase

Identifiers
- EC no.: 2.7.11.30
- CAS no.: 146702-86-5

Databases
- IntEnz: IntEnz view
- BRENDA: BRENDA entry
- ExPASy: NiceZyme view
- KEGG: KEGG entry
- MetaCyc: metabolic pathway
- PRIAM: profile
- PDB structures: RCSB PDB PDBe PDBsum
Search
- PMC: articles
- PubMed: articles
- NCBI: proteins

Receptor protein serine/threonine kinases (EC 2.7.11.30) are enzyme-linked receptors that belong to protein-serine/threonine kinases. The systematic name of this enzyme class is ATP:[receptor-protein] phosphotransferase. Proteins from this group participate in numerous biological pathways, processes and diseases including MAPK signaling pathway, cytokine-cytokine receptor interactions, TGF beta signaling pathway, colorectal cancer, pancreatic cancer, and chronic myeloid leukemia.

Receptor serine/threonine kinases directly phosphorylate specific serines or threonines on themselves and on other regulatory proteins.

== Links ==
- Receptor protein serine/threonine kinases in IUPHAR Guide to Pharmacology
