= Bone morphogenetic protein 8A =

Protein found in humans

BMP8A

Identifiers
- Aliases: BMP8A, entrez:353500, bone morphogenetic protein 8a, OP-2
- External IDs: MGI: 104515; GeneCards: BMP8A

Gene location (Human)
Chr.	Chromosome 1 (human)
Band	1p34.3	Start	39,491,636 bp
Band	1p34.3	End	39,529,869 bp

Gene location (Mouse)
Chr.	Chromosome 4 (mouse)
Band	4 D2.2|4 57.42 cM	Start	123,206,438 bp
Band	4 D2.2|4 57.42 cM	End	123,237,045 bp
RNA expression pattern
Bgee	Human / Mouse (ortholog); Top expressed in: right lobe of thyroid gland; left lobe of thyroid gland; periodontal fiber; tibia; C1 segment; left ovary; right ovary; islet of Langerhans; smooth muscle tissue; tibial nerve / Top expressed in: decidua; gastrula; intestinal villus; calvaria; hair follicle; molar; jejunum; embryo; Ileal epithelium; body of femur; More reference expression data
BioGPS	n/a
Gene ontology
Molecular function	transforming growth factor beta receptor binding; cytokine activity; BMP receptor binding; growth factor activity
Cellular component	extracellular region; extracellular space
Biological process	regulation of apoptotic process; multicellular organism development; positive regulation of pathway-restricted SMAD protein phosphorylation; cartilage development; negative regulation of insulin secretion; cell differentiation; regulation of MAPK cascade; SMAD protein signal transduction; cell development; BMP signaling pathway; ossification; diet induced thermogenesis; regulation of signaling receptor activity; energy homeostasis
Sources:Amigo / QuickGO
Orthologs
Databases	NCBI: entry; OMA: entry
Species	Human	Mouse
Entrez	353500	12163
Ensembl	ENSG00000183682	ENSMUSG00000032726
UniProt	Q7Z5Y6	P34821
RefSeq (mRNA)	NM_181809	NM_001256019; NM_007558
RefSeq (protein)	NP_861525	NP_001242948; NP_031584
Location (UCSC)	Chr 1: 39.49 – 39.53 Mb	Chr 4: 123.21 – 123.24 Mb
PubMed search
- Wikidata
View/Edit Human	View/Edit Mouse

Bone morphogenetic protein 8A (BMP8A) is a protein that in humans is encoded by the BMP8A gene.

BMP8A is a polypeptide member of the TGFβ superfamily of proteins. It, like other bone morphogenetic proteins (BMPs), is involved in the development of bone and cartilage. BMP8A may be involved in epithelial osteogenesis. It also plays a role in bone homeostasis. It is a disulfide-linked homodimer.
