= Bone morphogenetic protein =

Group of growth factor proteins

Bone morphogenetic proteins (BMPs) are a group of growth factors also known as cytokines and as metabologens. Professor Marshall Urist and Professor Hari Reddi discovered their ability to induce the formation of bone and cartilage, BMPs are now considered to constitute a group of pivotal morphogenetic signals, orchestrating tissue architecture throughout the body. The important functioning of BMP signals in physiology is emphasized by the multitude of roles for dysregulated BMP signalling in pathological processes. Cancerous disease often involves misregulation of the BMP signalling system. Absence of BMP signalling is, for instance, an important factor in the progression of colon cancer, and conversely, overactivation of BMP signalling following reflux-induced esophagitis provokes Barrett's esophagus and is thus instrumental in the development of esophageal adenocarcinoma.

Recombinant human BMPs (rhBMPs) are used in orthopedic applications such as spinal fusions, nonunions, and oral surgery. rhBMP-2 and rhBMP-7 are Food and Drug Administration (FDA)-approved for some uses. rhBMP-2 causes more overgrown bone than any other BMPs and is widely used off-label.

== Medical uses ==
BMPs for clinical use are produced using recombinant DNA technology (recombinant human BMPs; rhBMPs). Recombinant BMP-2 and BMP-7 are currently approved for human use.

rhBMPs are used in oral surgeries. BMP-7 has also recently found use in the treatment of chronic kidney disease (CKD). BMP-7 has been shown in murine animal models to reverse the loss of glomeruli due to sclerosis.

A 2022 study by researchers from the Mayo Clinic, Maastricht University, and Ethris GmBH, a biotech company that focuses on RNA therapeutics, found that chemically modified mRNA encoding BMP-2 promoted dosage-dependent healing of femoral osteotomies in male rats. The mRNA molecules were complexed within nonviral lipid particles, loaded onto sponges, and surgically implanted into the bone defects. They remained localized around the site of application. Compared to receiving rhBMP-2 directly, bony tissues regenerated after mRNA treatment displayed superior strength and less formation of massive callus.

=== Off-label use ===
Although rhBMP-2 and rhBMP-7 are used in the treatment of a variety of bone-related conditions including spinal fusions and nonunions, the risks of this off-label treatment are not understood. While rhBMPs are approved for specific applications (spinal lumbar fusions with an anterior approach and tibia nonunions), up to 85% of all BMP usage is off-label. rhBMP-2 is used extensively in other lumbar spinal fusion techniques (e.g., using a posterior approach, anterior or posterior cervical fusions).

=== Alternative to autograft in long bone nonunions ===
In 2001, the Food and Drug Administration (FDA) approved rhBMP-7 (a.k.a. OP-1; Stryker Biotech) for a humanitarian device exemption as an alternative to autograft in long bone nonunions. In 2004, the humanitarian device exemption was extended as an alternative to autograft for posterolateral fusion. In 2002, rhBMP-2 (Infuse; Medtronic) was approved for anterior lumbar interbody fusions (ALIFs) with a lumbar fusion device. In 2008 it was approved to repair posterolateral lumbar pseudarthrosis, open tibia shaft fractures with intramedullary nail fixation. In these products, BMPs are delivered to the site of the fracture by being incorporated into a bone implant, and released gradually to allow bone formation, as the growth stimulation by BMPs must be localized and sustained for some weeks. The BMPs are eluted through a purified collagen matrix which is implanted in the site of the fracture. rhBMP-2 helps grow bone better than any other rhBMP so it is much more widely used clinically. There is "little debate or controversy" about the effectiveness of rhBMP-2 to grow bone to achieve spinal fusions, and Medtronic generates $700 million in annual sales from their product.

== Contraindications ==
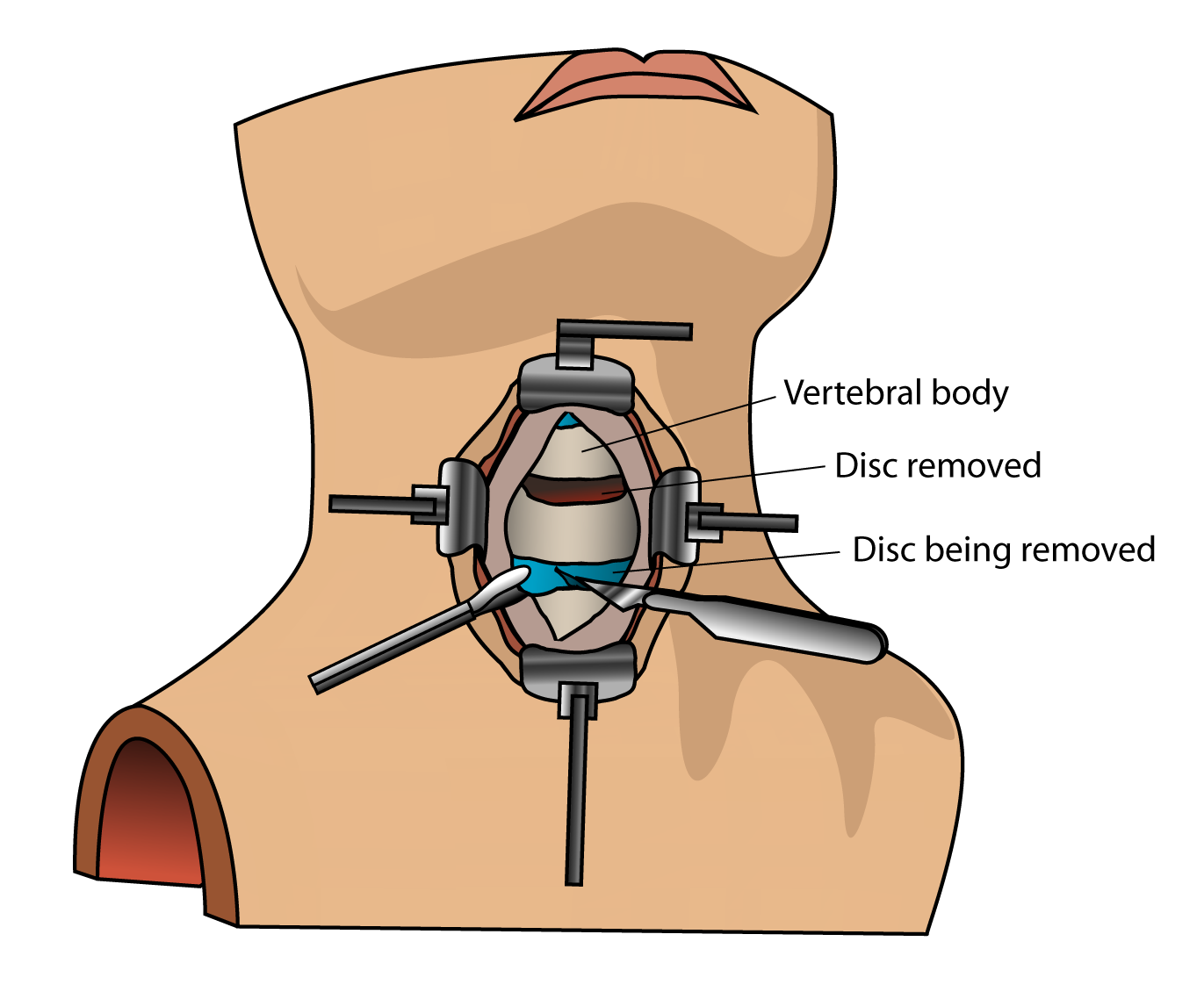
anterior cervical discectomy and fusion

Bone morphogenetic protein (rhBMP) should not be routinely used in any type of anterior cervical spine fusion, such as with anterior cervical discectomy and fusion. There are reports of this therapy causing swelling of soft tissue which in turn can cause life-threatening complications due to difficulty swallowing and pressure on the respiratory tract.

== Function ==
BMPs interact with specific receptors on the cell surface, referred to as bone morphogenetic protein receptors (BMPRs).

Signal transduction through BMPRs results in mobilization of members of the SMAD family of proteins. The signaling pathways involving BMPs, BMPRs and SMADs are important in the development of the heart, central nervous system, and cartilage, as well as post-natal bone development.

They have an important role during embryonic development on the embryonic patterning and early skeletal formation. As such, disruption of BMP signaling can affect the body plan of the developing embryo. For example, BMP4 and its inhibitors noggin and chordin help regulate polarity of the embryo (i.e. back to front patterning). Specifically BMP-4 and its inhibitors play a major role in neurulation and the development of the neural plate. BMP-4 signals ectoderm cells to develop into skin cells, but the secretion of inhibitors by the underlying mesoderm blocks the action of BMP-4 to allow the ectoderm to continue on its normal course of neural cell development. Additionally, secretion of BMPs by the roof plate in the developing spinal cord helps to specify dorsal sensory interneurons.

As a member of the transforming growth factor-beta superfamily, BMP signaling regulates a variety of embryonic patterning during fetal and embryonic development. For example, BMP signaling controls the early formation of the Müllerian duct (MD) which is a tubular structure in early embryonic developmental stage and eventually becomes female reproductive tracts. Chemical inhibiting BMP signals in chicken embryo caused a disruption of MD invagination and blocked the epithelial thickening of the MD-forming region, indicating that the BMP signals play a role in early MD development. Moreover, BMP signaling is involved in the formation of foregut and hindgut, intestinal villus patterning, and endocardial differentiation. Villi contribute to increase the effective absorption of nutrients by extending the surface area in small intestine. Gain or lose function of BMP signaling altered the patterning of clusters and emergence of villi in mouse intestinal model. BMP signal derived from myocardium is also involved in endocardial differentiation during heart development. Inhibited BMP signal in zebrafish embryonic model caused strong reduction of endocardial differentiation, but only had little effect in myocardial development. In addition, Notch-Wnt-Bmp crosstalk is required for radial patterning during mouse cochlea development via antagonizing manner.

Mutations in BMPs and their inhibitors are associated with a number of human disorders which affect the skeleton.

Several BMPs are also named 'cartilage-derived morphogenetic proteins' (CDMPs), while others are referred to as 'growth differentiation factors' (GDFs).

BMPs are also involved in adipogenesis and functional regulation of adipose tissue. BMP4 favors white adipogenesis, whereas BMP7 activates brown fat functionality; BMP inhibitors are also involved in this regulation

== Types ==
Originally, seven such proteins were discovered. Of these, six (BMP2 through BMP7) belong to the Transforming growth factor beta superfamily of proteins. BMP1 is a metalloprotease. Since then, thirteen more BMPs, all of which are in the TGF-beta family, have been discovered, bringing the total to twenty. The current nomenclature only recognizes 13, as many others are put under the growth differentiation factor naming instead.

| BMP | Known functions | Gene Locus |
|---|---|---|
| BMP1 | *BMP1 does not belong to the TGF-β family of proteins. It is a metalloprotease that acts on procollagen I, II, and III. It is involved in cartilage development. | Chromosome: 8; Location: 8p21 |
| BMP2 | Acts as a disulfide-linked homodimer and induces bone and cartilage formation. It is a candidate as a retinoid mediator. Plays a key role in osteoblast differentiation. | Chromosome: 20; Location: 20p12 |
| BMP3 | Induces bone formation. BMP 3 is also known as osteogenin. | Chromosome: 14; Location: 14p22 |
| BMP4 | Regulates the formation of teeth, limbs and bone from mesoderm. It also plays a role in fracture repair, epidermis formation, dorsal-ventral axis formation, and ovarian follical development. | Chromosome: 14; Location: 14q22-q23 |
| BMP5 | Performs functions in cartilage development. | Chromosome: 6; Location: 6p12.1 |
| BMP6 | Plays a role in joint integrity in adults. Controls iron homeostasis via regulation of hepcidin. | Chromosome: 6; Location: 6p12.1 |
| BMP7 | Plays a key role in osteoblast differentiation. It also induces the production of SMAD1. Also key in renal development and repair. | Chromosome: 20; Location: 20q13 |
| BMP8a | Involved in bone and cartilage development. | Chromosome: 1; Location: 1p35–p32 |
| BMP8b | Expressed in the hippocampus. | Chromosome: 1; Location: 1p35–p32 |
| BMP10 | May play a role in the trabeculation of the embryonic heart. | Chromosome: 2; Location: 2p14 |
| BMP11 | Controls anterior-posterior patterning. | Chromosome: 12; Location: 12p |
| BMP15 | May play a role in oocyte and follicular development. | Chromosome: X; Location: Xp11.2 |

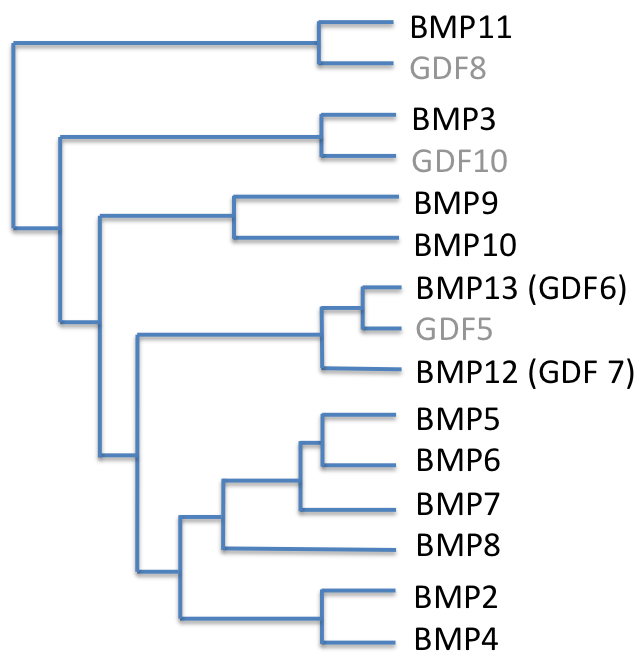
Sequence relationships among mammalian bone morphogenetic proteins (mouse/human). Modified after Ducy & Karsenty 2000

== History ==
From the time of Hippocrates it has been known that bone has considerable potential for regeneration and repair. Nicholas Senn, a surgeon at Rush Medical College in Chicago, described the utility of antiseptic decalcified bone implants in the treatment of osteomyelitis and certain bone deformities. Pierre Lacroix proposed that there might be a hypothetical substance, osteogenin, that might initiate bone growth.

The biological basis of bone morphogenesis was shown by Marshall R. Urist. Urist made the key discovery that demineralized, lyophilized segments of bone induced new bone formation when implanted in muscle pouches in rabbits. This discovery was published in 1965 by Urist in Science. Urist proposed the name "Bone Morphogenetic Protein" in the scientific literature in the Journal of Dental Research in 1971.

Bone induction is a sequential multistep cascade. The key steps in this cascade are chemotaxis, mitosis, and differentiation. Early studies by Hari Reddi unraveled the sequence of events involved in bone-matrix-induced bone morphogenesis. On the basis of the above work, it seemed likely that morphogens were present in the bone matrix. Using a battery of bioassays for bone formation, a systematic study was undertaken to isolate and purify putative bone morphogenetic proteins.

A major stumbling block to purification was the insolubility of demineralized bone matrix. To overcome this hurdle, Hari Reddi and Kuber Sampath used dissociative extractants, such as 4M guanidine HCL, 8M urea, or 1% SDS. The soluble extract alone or the insoluble residues alone were incapable of new bone induction. This work suggested that the optimal osteogenic activity requires a synergy between soluble extract and the insoluble collagenous substratum. It not only represented a significant advance toward the final purification of bone morphogenetic proteins by the Reddi laboratory, but ultimately also enabled the cloning of BMPs by John Wozney and colleagues at Genetics Institute.

== Society ==
=== Costs ===
At between US$6,000 and $10,000 for a typical treatment, BMPs can be costly compared with other techniques such as bone grafting. However, this cost is often far less than the costs required with orthopaedic revision in multiple surgeries.

While there is little debate that rhBMPs are successful clinically, there is controversy about their use. It is common for orthopedic surgeons to be paid for their contribution to the development of a new product, but some of the surgeons responsible for the original Medtronic-supported studies on the efficacy of rhBMP-2 have been accused of bias and conflict of interest. For example, one surgeon, a lead author on four of these research papers, did not disclose any financial ties while with the company on three of the papers; he was paid over $4 million by Medtronic. In another study, the lead author did not disclose any financial ties to Medtronic; he was paid at least $11 million by the company. In a series of 12 publications, the median financial ties of the authors to Medtronic were $12–16 million. In those studies that had more than 20 and 100 patients, one or more authors had financial ties of $1 million and $10 million, respectively. Early clinical trials using rhBMP-2 underreported adverse events associated with treatment. In the 13 original industry-sponsored publications related to safety, there were zero adverse events in 780 patients. It has since been revealed that potential complications can arise from the use including implant displacement, subsidence, infection, urogenital events, and retrograde ejaculation.

Based on a study conducted by the Department of Family Medicine at the Oregon Health and Science University the use of BMP increased rapidly, from 5.5% of fusion cases in 2003 to 28.1% of fusion cases in 2008. BMP use was greater among patients with previous surgery and among those having complex fusion procedures (combined anterior and posterior approach, or greater than 2 disc levels). Major medical complications, wound complications, and 30-day rehospitalization rates were nearly identical with or without BMP. Reoperation rates were also very similar, even after stratifying by previous surgery or surgical complexity, and after adjusting for demographic and clinical features. On average, adjusted hospital charges for operations involving BMP were about $15,000 more than hospital charges for fusions without BMP, though reimbursement under Medicare's Diagnosis-Related Group system averaged only about $850 more. Significantly fewer patients receiving BMP were discharged to a skilled nursing facility.
