= Bone morphogenetic protein 3 =

Protein-coding gene in the species Homo sapiens

BMP3

Identifiers
- Aliases: BMP3, BMP-3A, bone morphogenetic protein 3
- External IDs: OMIM: 112263; MGI: 88179; GeneCards: BMP3
Available structures
PDB	Ortholog search: PDBe RCSB
PDB	List of PDB id codes 2QCQ

Gene location (Human)
Chr.	Chromosome 4 (human)
Band	4q21.21	Start	81,030,708 bp
Band	4q21.21	End	81,057,627 bp

Gene location (Mouse)
Chr.	Chromosome 5 (mouse)
Band	5 E3|5 48.24 cM	Start	99,002,274 bp
Band	5 E3|5 48.24 cM	End	99,032,255 bp
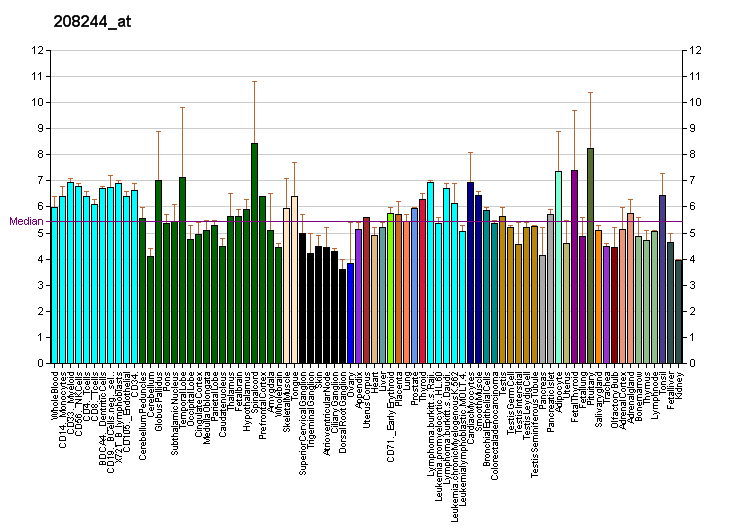
RNA expression pattern
Bgee	Human / Mouse (ortholog); Top expressed in: muscle layer of sigmoid colon; testicle; rectum; transverse colon; mucosa of transverse colon; tibial nerve; olfactory zone of nasal mucosa; palpebral conjunctiva; gallbladder; epithelium of colon / Top expressed in: perichondrium; lower lip; upper lip; urinary bladder; nucleus pulposus; cervical ganglion; urethra; skeleton; facial skeleton; ureter; More reference expression data
BioGPS	More reference expression data
Gene ontology
Molecular function	cytokine activity; BMP receptor binding; transforming growth factor beta receptor binding; growth factor activity; signaling receptor binding
Cellular component	extracellular region; extracellular exosome; extracellular space
Biological process	regulation of apoptotic process; skeletal system development; cell differentiation; regulation of MAPK cascade; SMAD protein signal transduction; cell development; ossification; cell-cell signaling; positive regulation of pathway-restricted SMAD protein phosphorylation; BMP signaling pathway; multicellular organism development; cartilage development; osteoblast differentiation; regulation of signaling receptor activity
Sources:Amigo / QuickGO
Orthologs
Databases	NCBI: entry; OMA: entry
Species	Human	Mouse
Entrez	651	110075
Ensembl	ENSG00000152785	ENSMUSG00000029335
UniProt	P12645	Q8BHE5
RefSeq (mRNA)	NM_001201	NM_173404; NM_001310677
RefSeq (protein)	NP_001192	NP_001297606; NP_775580
Location (UCSC)	Chr 4: 81.03 – 81.06 Mb	Chr 5: 99 – 99.03 Mb
PubMed search
- Wikidata
View/Edit Human	View/Edit Mouse

Bone morphogenetic protein 3, also known as osteogenin, is a protein in humans that is encoded by the BMP3 gene.

The protein encoded by this gene is a member of the transforming growth factor beta superfamily. It, unlike other bone morphogenetic proteins (BMP's) inhibits the ability of other BMP's to induce bone and cartilage development. It is a disulfide-linked homodimer. It negatively regulates bone density. BMP3 is an antagonist to other BMP's in the differentiation of osteogenic progenitors. It is highly expressed in fractured tissues.

== Cancer ==
BMP3 is hypermethylated in many cases of colorectal cancer (CRC) and hence along with other hypermethylated genes, may be used as a biomarker to detect early stage CRC.
