= Bone morphogenetic protein 7 =

Protein-coding gene in the species Homo sapiens

BMP7
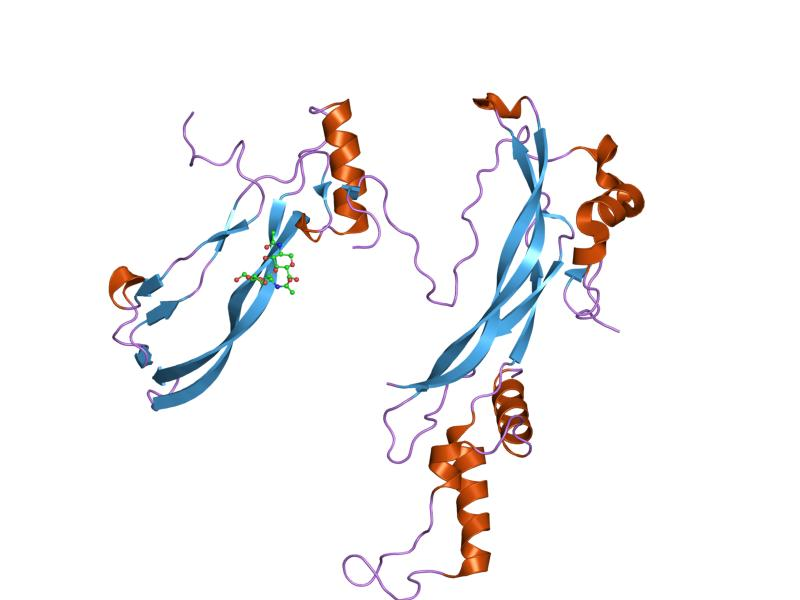

Identifiers
- Aliases: BMP7, OP-1, bone morphogenetic protein 7
- External IDs: OMIM: 112267; MGI: 103302; GeneCards: BMP7
Available structures
PDB	Ortholog search: PDBe RCSB
PDB	List of PDB id codes 1BMP, 1LX5, 1LXI, 1M4U

Gene location (Human)
Chr.	Chromosome 20 (human)
Band	20q13.31	Start	57,168,753 bp
Band	20q13.31	End	57,266,641 bp

Gene location (Mouse)
Chr.	Chromosome 2 (mouse)
Band	2 H3|2 95.54 cM	Start	172,709,805 bp
Band	2 H3|2 95.54 cM	End	172,782,114 bp
RNA expression pattern
Bgee	Human / Mouse (ortholog); Top expressed in: retinal pigment epithelium; ventricular zone; optic nerve; ganglionic eminence; olfactory bulb; thyroid gland; left lobe of thyroid gland; right lobe of thyroid gland; buccal mucosa cell; mucosa of esophagus / Top expressed in: molar; allantois; lip; transitional epithelium of urinary bladder; optic nerve; surface ectoderm; genital tubercle; neural groove; neural fold; renal corpuscle; More reference expression data
BioGPS	n/a
Gene ontology
Molecular function	heparin binding; cytokine activity; transforming growth factor beta receptor binding; growth factor activity; BMP receptor binding; protein binding
Cellular component	extracellular region; extracellular matrix; extracellular space; vesicle; collagen-containing extracellular matrix
Biological process	eye development; pattern specification process; skeletal system development; ureteric bud development; negative regulation of neuron differentiation; embryonic pattern specification; mesenchyme development; anatomical structure formation involved in morphogenesis; negative regulation of cell cycle; mesonephros development; odontogenesis of dentin-containing tooth; mesenchymal cell differentiation; negative regulation of mitotic nuclear division; animal organ morphogenesis; metanephric mesenchyme morphogenesis; metanephros development; cellular response to hypoxia; regulation of pathway-restricted SMAD protein phosphorylation; regulation of removal of superoxide radicals; steroid hormone mediated signaling pathway; negative regulation of Notch signaling pathway; negative regulation of cell population proliferation; branching involved in salivary gland morphogenesis; regulation of apoptotic process; SMAD protein signal transduction; ossification; kidney development; negative regulation of cell death; tube morphogenesis; positive regulation of transcription, DNA-templated; negative regulation of prostatic bud formation; cartilage development; embryonic limb morphogenesis; negative regulation of MAP kinase activity; embryonic camera-type eye morphogenesis; positive regulation of neuron differentiation; positive regulation of cell differentiation; negative regulation of phosphorylation; regulation of branching involved in prostate gland morphogenesis; cell differentiation; neuron projection morphogenesis; nephrogenic mesenchyme morphogenesis; positive regulation of heterotypic cell-cell adhesion; epithelial cell differentiation; response to vitamin D; positive regulation of hyaluranon cable assembly; positive regulation of bone mineralization; dendrite development; negative regulation of neurogenesis; regulation of phosphorylation; BMP signaling pathway; positive regulation of osteoblast differentiation; epithelial to mesenchymal transition; negative regulation of transcription, DNA-templated; negative regulation of NF-kappaB transcription factor activity; branching morphogenesis of an epithelial tube; negative regulation of mesenchymal cell apoptotic process involved in nephron morphogenesis; negative regulation of glomerular mesangial cell proliferation; response to estradiol; monocyte aggregation; metanephric mesenchymal cell proliferation involved in metanephros development; positive regulation of cell death; cell development; negative regulation of striated muscle cell apoptotic process; positive regulation of pathway-restricted SMAD protein phosphorylation; mesoderm formation; response to peptide hormone; cellular response to BMP stimulus; positive regulation of dendrite development; salivary gland morphogenesis; axon guidance; multicellular organism development; positive regulation of peptidyl-threonine phosphorylation; positive regulation of apoptotic process; protein localization to nucleus; embryonic skeletal joint morphogenesis; camera-type eye morphogenesis; positive regulation of transcription by RNA polymerase II; endocardial cushion formation; pericardium morphogenesis; neural fold elevation formation; hindbrain development; cardiac muscle tissue development; pharyngeal system development; cardiac septum morphogenesis; chorio-allantoic fusion; heart trabecula morphogenesis; allantois development; positive regulation of epithelial to mesenchymal transition; positive regulation of cardiac neural crest cell migration involved in outflow tract morphogenesis; regulation of signaling receptor activity; positive regulation of gene expression; negative regulation of NIK/NF-kappaB signaling; regulation of MAPK cascade
Sources:Amigo / QuickGO
Orthologs
Databases	NCBI: entry; OMA: entry
Species	Human	Mouse
Entrez	655	12162
Ensembl	ENSG00000101144	ENSMUSG00000008999
UniProt	P18075	P23359
RefSeq (mRNA)	NM_001719	NM_007557
RefSeq (protein)	NP_001710; NP_001710.1	NP_031583
Location (UCSC)	Chr 20: 57.17 – 57.27 Mb	Chr 2: 172.71 – 172.78 Mb
PubMed search
- Wikidata
View/Edit Human	View/Edit Mouse

Bone morphogenetic protein 7 or BMP7 (also known as osteogenic protein-1 or OP-1) is a protein that in humans is encoded by the BMP7 gene.

== Function ==
The protein encoded by this gene is a member of the TGF-β superfamily. Like other members of the bone morphogenetic protein family of proteins, it plays a key role in the transformation of mesenchymal cells into bone and cartilage. It is inhibited by noggin and a similar protein, chordin, which are expressed in the Spemann-Mangold Organizer. BMP7 may be involved in bone homeostasis. It is expressed in the brain, kidneys and bladder.

BMP7 induces the phosphorylation of SMAD1 and SMAD5, which in turn induce transcription of numerous osteogenic genes. It has been demonstrated that BMP7 treatment is sufficient to induce all of the genetic markers of osteoblast differentiation in many cell types.

== Role in vertebrate development ==
The role of BMP7 in mammalian kidney development is through induction of MET of the metanephrogenic blastema. The epithelial tissue emerging from this MET process eventually forms the tubules and glomeruli of the nephron. BMP-7 is also important in homeostasis of the adult kidney by inhibiting ephithelial-mesenchymal transition (EMT). BMP-7 expression is attenuated when the nephron is placed under inflammatory or ischemic stress, leading to EMT, which can result in fibrosis of the kidney. This type of fibrosis often leads to renal failure, and is predictive of end stage renal disease.

BMP7 has been discovered to be crucial in the determination of ventral-dorsal organization in zebrafish. BMP7 causes the expression of ventral phenotypes while its complete inhibition creates a dorsal phenotype. Moreover, BMP7 is eventually partially "turned off" in embryonic development in order to create the dorsal parts of the organism.

In many early developmental experiments using zebrafish, scientists used caBMPR (constitutively active) and tBMP (truncated receptor) to determine the effect of BMP7 in embryogenesis. They found that the constitutively active, which causes BMP to be expressed everywhere creates a ventralized phenotype, whereas truncated, dorsalized.

== Therapeutic application ==
Human recombinant BMP7 has surgical uses and was originally marketed under the brand name OP1 (discontinued by Olympus Biotech, who bought it from Stryker). It can be used to aid in the fusion of vertebral bodies to prevent neurologic trauma. Also in the treatment of tibial non-union, frequently in cases where a bone graft has failed. rhBMP-2 is much more widely used clinically because it helps grow bone better than rhBMP-7 and other BMPs.

BMP7 also has the potential for treatment of chronic kidney disease. Kidney disease is characterized by derangement of the tubular architecture by both myofibroblast buildup and monocyte infiltration Because endogenous BMP-7 is an inhibitor of the TGF-β signaling cascade that induces fibrosis, the use of exogenous recombinant BMP-7 (rhBMP-7) could be a viable treatment of chronic kidney disease. It is also thought that BMP-7 reverses fibrosis and EMT through reduction in monocyte infiltration into inflamed tissue. On a molecular level, BMP-7 represses inflammation by knocking down the expression of several pro-inflammatory cytokines produced by monocytes. Reducing this inflammatory stress, in turn, reduces the chance of fibrosis.

Regardless of the mechanism of fibrosis or the origin of myofibroblasts, exogenous BMP-7 has been shown to reverse the EMT process and trigger MET. Eventually this restores the healthy epithelial cell population, and normal function of the kidneys in mice. This is pertinent in humans as well, because many diseases stemming from organ fibrosis occur via the EMT process. The epithelial-menenchymal transition is also problematic in cancer metastasis, so the diminution of EMT with recombinant DNA could have great implications in future cancer treatment options.

BMP7 administration has been proposed as a possible treatment for human infertility due to poor response to FSH treatment.

== Promotion of brown fat ==
It was discovered that mice injected with BMP7 increased their production of "good" brown fat cells, while keeping their levels of the normal white fat cells constant. A BMP7 therapy for obesity in humans may be developed as a result.

BMP7 not only stimulates brown adipogenesis, it also stimulates the "browning" of brite or beige adipocytes, turning them from a white-like phenotype into a brown-like phenotype (with induction of UCP1 and able to perform non-shivering thermogenesis, which allows to disperse energy as heat).

== Other possible effects ==
Several studies suggest that BMP7 may regulate or affect food intake.
