= SMAD (protein) =

Family of proteins

Smads (or SMADs) comprise a family of structurally similar proteins that are the main signal transducers for receptors of the transforming growth factor beta (TGF-B) superfamily, which are critically important for regulating cell development and growth. The abbreviation refers to the homologies to the Caenorhabditis elegans SMA ("small" worm phenotype) and MAD family ("Mothers Against Decapentaplegic") of genes in Drosophila.

There are three distinct sub-types of Smads: receptor-regulated Smads (R-Smads), common partner Smads (Co-Smads), and inhibitory Smads (I-Smads). The eight members of the Smad family are divided among these three groups. Trimers of two receptor-regulated SMADs and one co-SMAD act as transcription factors that regulate the expression of certain genes.

== Sub-types ==
The R-Smads consist of Smad1, Smad2, Smad3, Smad5 and Smad8/9, and are involved in direct signaling from the TGF-B receptor.

Smad4 is the only known human Co-Smad, and has the role of partnering with R-Smads to recruit co-regulators to the complex.

Finally, Smad6 and Smad7 are I-Smads that work to suppress the activity of R-Smads. While Smad7 is a general TGF-B signal inhibitor, Smad6 associates more specifically with BMP signaling. R/Co-Smads are primarily located in the cytoplasm, but accumulate in the nucleus following TGF-β signaling, where they can bind to DNA and regulate transcription. However, I-Smads are predominantly found in the nucleus, where they can act as direct transcriptional regulators.

== Discovery and nomenclature ==
Before Smads were discovered, it was unclear what downstream effectors were responsible for transducing TGF-B signals. Smads were first discovered in Drosophila, in which they are known as mothers against dpp (Mad), (Note: Mad mutations can be placed in an allelic series based on the relative severity of the maternal effect enhancement of weak dpp alleles, thus explaining the name "mothers against dpp".) through a genetic screen for dominant enhancers of decapentaplegic (dpp), the Drosophila version of TGF-B. Studies found that Mad null mutants showed similar phenotypes to dpp mutants, suggesting that Mad played an important role in some aspect of the dpp signaling pathway.

A similar screen done in the Caenorhabditis elegans protein SMA (from gene sma for small body size) revealed three genes, Sma-2, Sma-3, and Sma-4, that had similar mutant phenotypes to those of the TGF-B like receptor Daf-4. The human homologue of Mad and Sma was named Smad1, a portmanteau of the previously discovered genes. When injected into Xenopus embryo animal caps, Smad1 was found to be able to reproduce the mesoderm ventralizing effects that BMP4, a member of the TGF-B family, has on embryos. Furthermore, it was demonstrated that Smad1 had transactivational ability localized at the carboxy terminus, which can be enhanced by adding BMP4. This evidence suggests that Smad1 is responsible in part for transducing TGF-B signals.

== Protein ==
Smads are roughly between 400 and 500 amino acids long, and consist of two globular regions at the amino and carboxy termini, connected by a linker region. These globular regions are highly conserved in R-Smads and Co-Smads, and are called Mad homology 1 (MH1) at the N-terminus, and MH2 at the C-terminus. The MH2 domain is also conserved in I-Smads. The MH1 domain is primarily involved in DNA binding, while the MH2 is responsible for the interaction with other Smads and also for the recognition of transcriptional co-activators and co-repressors. R-Smads and Smad4 interact with several DNA motifs through the MH1 domain. These motifs include the CAGAC and its CAGCC variant, as well as the 5-bp consensus sequence GGC(GC)|(CG). Receptor-phosphorylated R-Smads can form homotrimers, as well as heterotrimers with Smad4 in vitro, via interactions between the MH2 domains. Trimers of one Smad4 molecule and two receptor-phosphorylated R-Smad molecules are thought to be the predominant effectors of TGF-β transcriptional regulation. The linker region between MH1 and MH2 is not just a connector, but also plays a role in protein function and regulation. Specifically, R-Smads are phosphorylated in the nucleus at the linker domain by CDK8 and 9, and these phosphorylations modulate the interaction of Smad proteins with transcriptional activators and repressors. Furthermore, after this phosphorylation step, the linker undergoes a second round of phosphorylations by GSK3, labelling Smads for their recognition by ubiquitin ligases, and targeting them for proteasome-mediated degradation. The transcription activators and the ubiquitin ligases both contain pairs of WW domains. These domains interact with the PY motif present in the R-Smad linker, as well as with the phosphorylated residues located in the proximity of the motif. Indeed, the different phosphorylation patterns generated by CDK8/9 and GSK3 define the specific interactions with either transcription activators or with ubiquitin ligases. Remarkably, the linker region has the highest concentration of amino acid differences among metazoans, although the phosphorylation sites and the PY motif are highly conserved.

== Sequence conservation ==
The components of the TGF-beta pathway and in particular, the R-Smads, Co-Smad and I-Smads, are represented in the genome of all metazoans sequenced to date. The level of sequence conservation of the Co-Smad and of R-Smads proteins across species is extremely high. This level of conservation of components—and sequences—suggests that the general functions of the TGF-beta pathway have remained generally intact ever since. I-Smads have conserved MH2 domains, but divergent MH1 domains as compared to R-Smads and Co-Smads.

== Role in TGF-β signalling pathway ==
=== R/Co-Smads ===
TGF-B ligands bind receptors consisting of type 1 and type 2 serine/threonine kinases, which serve to propagate the signal intracellularly. Ligand binding stabilizes a receptor complex consisting of two type 1 receptors, and two type 2 receptors. Type 2 receptors then can phosphorylate type 1 receptors at locations on the GS domain, located N-terminally to the type 1 kinase domain. This phosphorylation event activates the type 1 receptors, making them capable of further propagating the TGF-B signal via Smads. Type 1 receptors phosphorylate R-Smads at two C-terminal serines, which are arranged in an SSXS motif. Smads are localized at the cell surface by Smad anchor for receptor activation (SARA) proteins, placing them in proximity of type 1 receptor kinases to facilitate phosphorylation. Phosphorylation of the R-Smad causes it to dissociate from SARA, exposing a nuclear import sequence, as well as promoting its association with a Co-Smad. This Smad complex is then localized to the nucleus, where it is able to bind their target genes, with the help of other associated proteins.

=== I-Smads ===
I-Smads disrupt TGF-B signaling through a variety of mechanisms, including preventing association of R-Smads with type 1 receptors and Co-Smads, down-regulating type 1 receptors, and making transcriptional changes in the nucleus. The conserved MH2 domain of I-Smads is capable of binding to type 1 receptors, thus making it a competitive inhibitor of R-Smad binding. Following R-Smad activation, it forms a heteromeric complex with an I-Smad, which prevents its association with a Co-Smad. In addition, the I-Smad recruits a ubiquitin ligase to target the activate R-Smad for degradation, effectively silencing the TGF-β signal. I-Smads in the nucleus also compete with R/Co-Smad complexes for association with DNA binding elements. Reporter assays show that fusing I-Smads to the DNA-binding region of reporter genes decreases their expression, suggesting that I-Smads function as transcriptional repressors.

== Role in cell cycle control ==
In adult cells, TGF-β inhibits cell cycle progression, stopping cells from making the G1/S phase transition. This phenomenon is present in the epithelial cells of many organs, and is regulated in part by the Smad signaling pathway. The precise mechanism of control differs slightly between cell types.

One mechanism by which Smads facilitate TGF-β induced cytostasis is by downregulating Myc, which is a transcription factor that promotes cell growth. Myc also represses p15(Ink4b) and p21(Cip1), which are inhibitors of Cdk4 and Cdk2 respectively. When there is no TGF-β present, a repressor complex composed of Smad3, and the transcription factors E2F4 and p107 exist in the cytoplasm. However, when TGF-B signal is present, this complex localizes to the nucleus, where it associates with Smad4 and binds to the TGF-B inhibitory element (TIE) of the Myc promoter to repress its transcription.

In addition to Myc, Smads are also involved in the downregulation of Inhibitor of DNA Binding (ID) proteins. IDs are transcription factors that regulate genes involved in cell differentiation, maintaining multi-potency in stem cells, and promoting continuous cell cycling. Therefore, downregulating ID proteins is a pathway by which TGF-B signaling could arrest the cell cycle. In a DNA microarray screen, Id2 and Id3 were found to be repressed by TGF-B, but induced by BMP signaling. Knocking out Id2 and Id3 genes in epithelial cells enhances cell cycle inhibition by TGF-B, showing that they are important in mediating this cytostatic effect. Smads are both a direct and indirect inhibitor of Id expression. TGF-B signal triggers Smad3 phosphorylation, which in turn activates ATF3, a transcription factor that is induced during cellular stress. Smad3 and ATF3 then coordinate to repress Id1 transcription, resulting in its downregulation. Indirectly, Id downregulation is a secondary effect of Myc repression by Smad3. Since Myc is an inducer of Id2, downregulating Myc will also result in reduced Id2 signaling, which contributes to cell cycle arrest.

Studies show that Smad3, but not Smad2, is an essential effector for the cytostatic effects of TGF-B. Depleting endogeneous Smad3 via RNA interference was sufficient to interfere with TGF-B cytostasis. However, depleting Smad2 in a similar manner enhanced, rather than halted, TGF-B induced cell cycle arrest. This suggests while Smad3 is necessary for TGF-B cytostatic effect, the ratio of Smad3 to Smad2 modulates the intensity of the response. However, overexpressing Smad2 to change this ratio had no effect on the cytostatic response. Therefore, further experiments are necessary to definitely prove that the ratio of Smad3 to Smad2 regulates intensity of cytostatic effect in response to TGF-B.

Smad proteins have also been found to be direct transcriptional regulators of Cdk4. Reporter assays in which luciferase was placed under a Cdk4 promoter showed increased luciferase expression when Smad4 was targeted with siRNAs. Repression of Smad2 and 3 did not have any significant effect, suggesting that Cdk4 is directly regulated by Smad4.

== Clinical significance ==
=== Role of Smad in cancer ===
Defects in Smad signaling can result in TGF-B resistance, causing dysregulation of cell growth. Deregulation of TGF-B signaling has been implicated in many cancer types, including pancreatic, colon, breast, lung, and prostate cancer. Smad4 is most commonly mutated in human cancers, particularly pancreatic and colon cancer. Smad4 is inactivated in nearly half of all pancreatic cancers. As a result, Smad4 was first termed Deleted in Pancreatic Cancer Locus 4 (DPC4) upon its discovery. Germline Smad4 mutations are partially responsible for genetic disposition for human familial juvenile polyposis, which puts a person at high risk of developing potentially cancerous gastrointestinal polyps. Experimental supporting evidence for this observation comes from a study showing that heterozygous Smad4 knockout mice (±) uniformly developed gastrointestinal polyps by 100 weeks. Many familial Smad4 mutants occur on the MH2 domain, which disrupts the protein's ability to form homo- or hetero-oligomers, thus impairing TGF-B signal transduction.

Despite evidence showing that Smad3 is more critical than Smad2 in TGF-B signaling, the rate of Smad3 mutations in cancer is lower than that of Smad2. Choriocarcinoma tumor cells are TGF-B signaling resistant, as well as lacking Smad3 expression. Studies show that reintroducing Smad3 into choriocarcinoma cells is sufficient to increase TIMP-1 (tissue inhibitor of metalloprotease-1) levels, a mediator of TGF-B's anti-invasive effect, and thus restore TGF-B signaling. However, reintroducing Smad3 was not sufficient to rescue the anti-invasive effect of TGF-B. This suggests that other signaling mechanisms in addition to Smad3 are defective in TGF-B resistant choriocarcinoma.

=== Role of Smad in Alzheimer's ===
Alzheimer's patients display elevated levels of TGF-B and phosphorylated Smad2 in their hippocampal neurons. This finding is seemingly paradoxical, as TGF-B has previously been shown to have neuroprotective effects on Alzheimer's patients. This suggests that some aspect of TGF-B signaling is defective, causing TGF-B to lose its neuroprotective effects. Research has shown that phosphorylated Smad2 is ectopically localized to cytoplasmic granules rather than the nucleus, in hippocampal neurons of patients with Alzheimer's disease. Specifically, the ectopically located phosphorylated Smad2s were found within amyloid plaques, and attached to neurofibrillary tangles. These data suggest that Smad2 is involved in the development of Alzheimer's disease. Recent studies show that the peptidyl-prolyl cis-trans isomerase NIMA-interacting 1 (PIN1) is involved in promoting the abnormal localization of Smad2. Pin1 was found to co-localize with Smad2/3 and phosphorylated tau proteins within the cytoplasmic granules, suggesting a possible interaction. Transfecting Smad2 expressing cells with Pin1 causes proteasome-mediated Smad2 degradation, as well as increased association of Smad2 with phosphorylated tau. This feedback loop is bidirectional; Smad2 is also capable of increasing Pin1 mRNA synthesis. Thus, the two proteins could be caught in a "vicious cycle" of regulation. Pin1 causes both itself and Smad2 to be associated in insoluble neurofibrillary tangles, resulting in low levels of both soluble proteins. Smad2 then promotes Pin1 RNA synthesis to try and compensate, which only drives more Smad2 degradation and association with neurofibrillary tangles.

=== TGF-β/Smad signaling in kidney disease ===
Dysregulation of TGF-B/Smad signaling is a possible pathogenic mechanism of chronic kidney disease. In the kidneys, TGF-B1 promotes accumulation of the extracellular matrix (ECM) by increasing its production and inhibiting its degradation, which is characteristic of renal fibrosis. TGF-B1 signal is transduced by the R-Smads Smad2 and Smad3, both of which are found to be overexpressed in diseased kidneys. Smad3 knockout mice display reduced progression of renal fibrosis, suggesting its importance in regulating the disease. Conversely, inhibiting Smad2 in kidney cells (full Smad2 knockouts are embryonic lethal) actually leads to more severe fibrosis, suggesting that Smad2 works antagonistically to Smad3 in the progression of renal fibrosis. Unlike the R-Smads, Smad7 protein is typically under-expressed in diseased kidney cells. This loss of TGF-B inhibition results in increased amounts of active Smad2/3, which contribute to the progression of renal fibrosis as described above.
