= DOP1B =

Protein-coding gene in the species Homo sapiens

Identifiers
- Aliases: DOP1B, 21orf5, C21orf5, dopey family member 2, DOPEY2, DOP1 leucine zipper like protein B
- External IDs: OMIM: 604803; MGI: 1917278; GeneCards: DOP1B

Gene location (Human)
Chr.	Chromosome 21 (human)
Band	21q22.12	Start	36,156,782 bp
Band	21q22.12	End	36,294,274 bp

Gene location (Mouse)
Chr.	Chromosome 16 (mouse)
Band	16|16 C4	Start	93,508,792 bp
Band	16|16 C4	End	93,607,478 bp
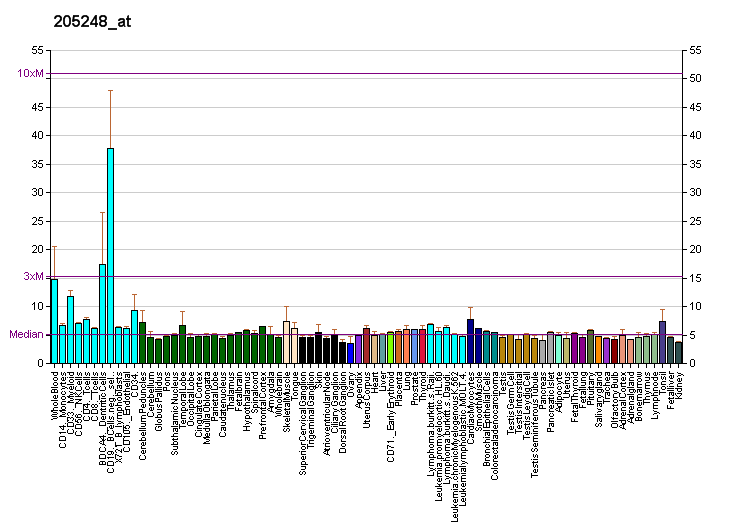
RNA expression pattern
Bgee	Human / Mouse (ortholog); Top expressed in: ganglionic eminence; rectum; cerebellar cortex; cerebellar hemisphere; right hemisphere of cerebellum; monocyte; testicle; minor salivary glands; muscle of leg; gastrocnemius muscle / Top expressed in: granulocyte; epithelium of stomach; superior frontal gyrus; primary visual cortex; cerebellar cortex; dentate gyrus of hippocampal formation granule cell; muscle of thigh; duodenum; secondary oocyte; facial motor nucleus; More reference expression data
BioGPS	More reference expression data
Gene ontology
Molecular function	molecular function
Cellular component	Golgi membrane; extracellular exosome; cytosol; endosome; trans-Golgi network; Golgi apparatus; membrane
Biological process	multicellular organism development; protein transport; cognition; endoplasmic reticulum organization; Golgi to endosome transport; transport
Sources:Amigo / QuickGO
Orthologs
Databases	NCBI: entry; OMA: entry
Species	Human	Mouse
Entrez	9980	70028
Ensembl	ENSG00000142197	ENSMUSG00000022946
UniProt	Q9Y3R5	Q3UHQ6
RefSeq (mRNA)	NM_005128; NM_001320714	NM_026700; NM_027293; NM_001357118
RefSeq (protein)	NP_001307643; NP_005119	NP_080976; NP_081569; NP_001344047
Location (UCSC)	Chr 21: 36.16 – 36.29 Mb	Chr 16: 93.51 – 93.61 Mb
PubMed search
- Wikidata
View/Edit Human	View/Edit Mouse

DOP1B is a human gene located just above the Down Syndrome chromosomal region (DSCR) located at 21p22.2 sub-band. Although the exact function of this gene is not yet fully understood, it has been proven to play a role in multiple biological processes, and its over-expression (triplication) has been linked to multiple facets of the Down Syndrome phenotype, most notably mental retardation.

== Gene ==
The DOP1B gene is located on human chromosome 21, at chromosome band 21q22.12. This band is located in open reading frame 5, hence the alias C21orf5. DOP1B gene is composed of 137,493 bases making up 37 exons and 39 distinct gt-ag introns, all located between CBR3 and KIAA0136 genes.

Transcription produces 10 unique mRNAs, 8 alternatively spliced variants, and 2 unspliced forms. These unique mRNAs differ by varying truncation of the 3' and 5' ends, as well as the presence of 3 cassette exons. These mRNA variants range from 7691bp (mRNA variant DOPEY2.aAug10) to 315bp (mRNA variant DOPEY2.jAug10-unspliced) and are further described in Table 1 below.

The mRNA expressed and levels of expression differ based on the location and tissue type in the body, but overall has been found to be expressed ubiquitously. The highest expression has been found in differentiating, rather than proliferating, tissue zones. Transcript was identified with the highest confidence in the erythroleukemia, placental cells and overall in the brain, and at a medium confidence level in the perirhinal cortex, medial temporal lobe, colon, as well in the salivary and adrenal glands.

== Protein ==
Of the ten mRNAs produced, six of them are translated into viable proteins. Please see table above for more details. The largest, having a molecular weight of 258230 Da, and highest expressed protein, DOP1B.a, is composed of 2298 amino acids that make up an N-terminal domain, seven transmembrane domains, and a C-terminal coiled coil stretch that forms a leucine-like zipper domain. Like other leucine zippers domains, DOP1B's C-terminal is hypothesized to be involved in multiple protein-protein and transcription factor interactions. This indicates that DOP1B might act as a transcription co-activator; however, further research must be done to fully understand the precise physiological function.

== Protein interactions ==
Very little work has been done on understanding the intricacies of the protein interactions; however, STRING has identified direct links with three proteins: MON2, TRIP12, and HECTD1. DOP1B is also indirectly associated with the following proteins: ARL16, ATP9A, ARL1, ATP9B, UBE3A, HERC5, HERC4, HACE1, UBE3C, and UBR5. See Figure 2 for interactions.

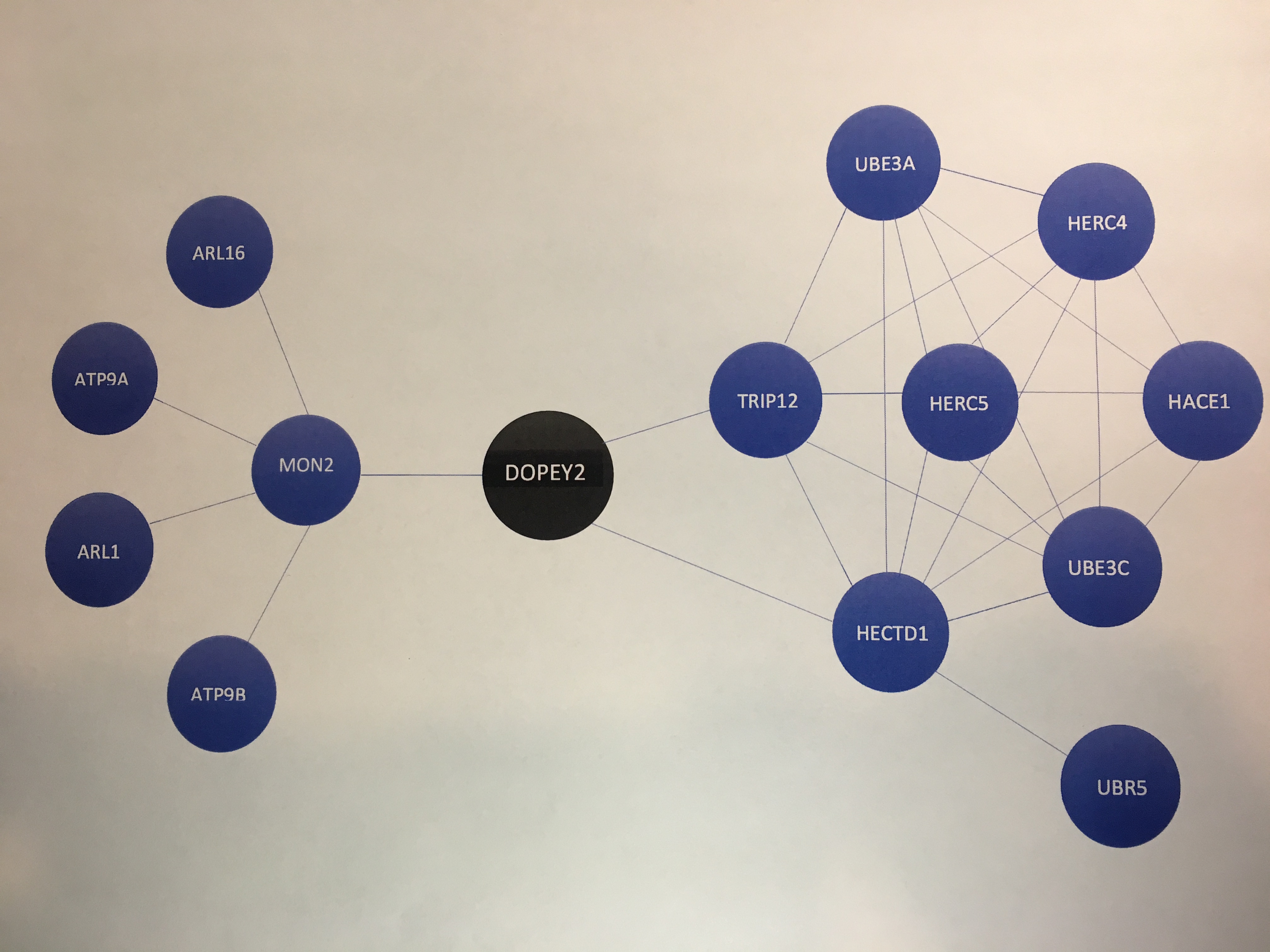
Figure 2. Overview of direct protein interactions that have been experimentally determined. These interactions and relationships include gene fusions, co-occurrences, co-expressions, and homologies.

== Homology ==
Phylogenesis suggest that DOP1B can be traced back to a common ancestor of animals and fungi due to its highly conserved C-terminal domain DOP1B has 84 known orthologs and 158 speciation nodes in the gene tree. The most similar orthologs being in the chimpanzee (Pan troglodytes), dog (Canis familiaris), cow (Bos Taurus), as well as the rat and mouse (Rattus norvegicus and Mus musculus).

The only known paralog is DOPEY1.

== Sub-cellular localization ==
Gene Ontology (GO) has traced the DOP1B protein to 5 main areas: the Golgi membrane, the trans-Golgi network, cytosol, and extracellular endosome. COMPARTMENTS localization data places the highest confidence of localization to the extracellular exosome and the Golgi membrane.

Figure 1: Description of mRNA and Protein Variants:

mRNA Variant	Spliced mRNA Length	Protein Length	5' UTR	3' UTR	Unspliced pre-mRNA Length	Number of Exons	Tissue-mRNA Expression (no strict specificity implied)
aAug10	7691 bp	2298 aa	85 bp	709 bp	129746 bp	37	ubiquitous
bAug10	2173 bp	332aa		1174 bp	15610 bp	6	carcinoid, lung, colon, colon tumor, RER+
cAug10	742 bp	222 aa	74 bp		49789 bp	6	breast, t-lymphocytes
dAug10	623 bp	145 aa	188 bp		43664 bp	4	lung
eAug10	345 bp	114 aa			9925 bp	3	spleen
fAug10	571 bp	110 aa	241 bp		1322 bp	2	thalamus
gAug10	549 bp	non-coding	11 bp	499 bp	794 bp	2	spleen
hAug- unspliced	543 bp	non-coding	377 bp		543 bp	1	stomach
iAug10	514 bp	non-coding	205 bp	204 bp	7377 bp	2	thyroid gland
jAug10- unspliced	315 bp	non-coding		165 bp	315 bp	1	marrow

== Function ==
As mentioned previously, the specific function and however, its function can be largely inferred through the study of similar genes. DOP1B has been found to be involved in the following processes: multicellular organism development in cell differentiation and developmental patterning, cognition, as well as endoplasmic reticulum organization and Golgi to endosome transport.

=== Cell differentiation and patterning ===
The DOP1B ortholog, pad-1, in C. elegans, was found to have a role in cell differentiation and patterning. In an experiment where the pad-1 was silenced using RNA-mediated interference, the phenotype of the injected worm's offspring was fetal lethality. The reason being: most of the embryonic tissues did not undergo appropriate cell patterning during gastrulation. Abnormally positioned cells lead to misinformation of organs; the failed morphogenesis of embryo. A similar observation was made in the inactivation of the Dop1 gene, the DOP1B ortholog, in S. cerevisiae. The inactivation lead to abnormal cell positioning and subsequent death. Overexpression of the N-terminal in S. cerevisiae also resulted in a loss of proper growth polarity and abnormal asexual reproductive patterning. This function was further supported by the function of the ortholog DopA in A. nidulans, which similarly codes for a 207kDa protein that also contains leucine zipper-like domains. Its inactivation revealed its role directing alternations in cell division timing, growth polarity, as well as cell-specific gene expression, ultimately affecting organogenesis and cell differentiation.

=== Endoplasmic reticulum and golgi transport ===
Dop1, an ortholog of DOP1B, in S. cerevisiae was found to play an essential role in membrane organization. It was found that it forms a complex with another protein, Mon2, which recruits the pool of Dop1 from the Golgi. In a Mon2 knockout model, Dop1 was mislocalized, and in turn resulted in defective cycling between endosomes and the Golgi. In a Dop1 knockout model, severe defects in the endoplasmic reticulum organization. This Dop1 and Mon2 complex was also linked to traffic in the endocytic pathway.

== Clinical significance ==
=== Cognition ===
DOP1B has been identified as a CNV region in Alzheimer's disease subjects, and its triplication has been tied to various phenotypic aspects of Down Syndrome.

=== Down syndrome ===
DOP1B has been associated with the Down Syndrome phenotype. When DOP1B was overexpressed in mice, abnormal lamination patterns of cortical cells was observed, as well as altered cortical, hippocampal, and cerebellar cells, regions that play key roles in memory and learning. These changes are similar to those observed in patients with Down syndrome. It is because of this that C21orf15 is now being studied as a new candidate gene for the intellectual disability phenotype in Down Syndrome.

== See also ==
- Down Syndrome
- Chromosome 21
