= Protein zyg-11 homolog A =

Protein found in humans

ZYG11A

Identifiers
- Aliases: ZYG11A, ZYG11, zyg-11 family member A, cell cycle regulator
- External IDs: MGI: 2446208; GeneCards: ZYG11A

Gene location (Human)
Chr.	Chromosome 1 (human)
Band	1p32.3	Start	52,842,511 bp
Band	1p32.3	End	52,894,998 bp

Gene location (Mouse)
Chr.	Chromosome 4 (mouse)
Band	4|4 C7	Start	108,038,935 bp
Band	4|4 C7	End	108,075,245 bp
RNA expression pattern
Bgee	Human / Mouse (ortholog); Top expressed in: oocyte; secondary oocyte; testicle; buccal mucosa cell; gonad; right lobe of thyroid gland; left lobe of thyroid gland; right testis; right lobe of liver; human kidney / Top expressed in: morula; blastocyst; embryo; spermatid; embryo; spermatocyte; tail of embryo; muscle of thigh; yolk sac; muscle tissue; More reference expression data
BioGPS	n/a
Gene ontology
Molecular function	ubiquitin-protein transferase activity
Cellular component	Cul2-RING ubiquitin ligase complex
Biological process	regulation of ubiquitin-protein transferase activity; protein ubiquitination
Sources:Amigo / QuickGO
Orthologs
Databases	NCBI: entry; OMA: entry
Species	Human	Mouse
Entrez	440590	230590
Ensembl	ENSG00000203995	ENSMUSG00000034645
UniProt	Q6WRX3	n/a
RefSeq (mRNA)	NM_001004339; NM_001307931	NM_001167936
RefSeq (protein)	NP_001004339; NP_001294860	n/a
Location (UCSC)	Chr 1: 52.84 – 52.89 Mb	Chr 4: 108.04 – 108.08 Mb
PubMed search
- Wikidata
View/Edit Human	View/Edit Mouse

Protein zyg-11 homolog A is a protein that in humans is encoded by the ZYG11A gene. The function of this protein is not well understood, but it is thought to probably acts as a subunit in a E3 ubiquitin ligase complex, involved in the recruitment of its target. It is found in humans and other animals.
