= SMURF1 =

Mammalian protein found in Homo sapiens

Identifiers
- Aliases: SMURF1, SMAD specific E3 ubiquitin protein ligase 1
- External IDs: OMIM: 605568; MGI: 1923038; GeneCards: SMURF1
Available structures
PDB	Ortholog search: PDBe RCSB
PDB	List of PDB id codes 2LAZ, 2LB0, 2LB1, 2LTX, 3PYC
Enzyme activity
EC #	BRENDA	ExPASy	KEGG	MetaCyc
2.3.2.26	↗	↗	↗	↗

Gene location (Human)
Chr.	Chromosome 7 (human)
Band	7q22.1	Start	99,027,440 bp
Band	7q22.1	End	99,144,108 bp

Gene location (Mouse)
Chr.	Chromosome 5 (mouse)
Band	5|5 G2	Start	144,813,305 bp
Band	5|5 G2	End	144,902,657 bp
RNA expression pattern
Bgee	Human / Mouse (ortholog); Top expressed in: popliteal artery; tibial arteries; sural nerve; islet of Langerhans; left ovary; skin of leg; gastric mucosa; skin of abdomen; right lung; left coronary artery / Top expressed in: gastrula; spermatocyte; zygote; secondary oocyte; tail of embryo; seminiferous tubule; spermatid; submandibular gland; otolith organ; genital tubercle; More reference expression data
BioGPS	n/a
Gene ontology
Molecular function	R-SMAD binding; I-SMAD binding; activin binding; protein binding; phospholipid binding; transferase activity; ubiquitin-protein transferase activity; ubiquitin protein ligase activity
Cellular component	cytoplasm; cytosol; membrane; plasma membrane; nucleoplasm; axon; soma; mitochondrion; extracellular exosome
Biological process	cell differentiation; engulfment of target by autophagosome; ectoderm development; protein polyubiquitination; BMP signaling pathway; receptor catabolic process; ubiquitin-dependent SMAD protein catabolic process; negative regulation of ossification; protein localization to cell surface; protein targeting to vacuole involved in autophagy; positive regulation of ubiquitin-dependent protein catabolic process; protein ubiquitination; protein export from nucleus; positive regulation of dendrite extension; proteasome-mediated ubiquitin-dependent protein catabolic process; negative regulation of transforming growth factor beta receptor signaling pathway; transforming growth factor beta receptor signaling pathway; Wnt signaling pathway, planar cell polarity pathway; parkin-mediated stimulation of mitophagy in response to mitochondrial depolarization; substrate localization to autophagosome; ubiquitin-dependent protein catabolic process; negative regulation of BMP signaling pathway; protein localization to plasma membrane; positive regulation of protein catabolic process
Sources:Amigo / QuickGO
Orthologs
Databases	NCBI: entry; OMA: entry
Species	Human	Mouse
Entrez	57154	75788
Ensembl	ENSG00000284126; ENSG00000198742	ENSMUSG00000038780
UniProt	Q9HCE7	Q9CUN6
RefSeq (mRNA)	NM_001199847; NM_020429; NM_181349	NM_001038627; NM_029438
RefSeq (protein)	NP_001186776; NP_065162; NP_851994	NP_001033716; NP_083714
Location (UCSC)	Chr 7: 99.03 – 99.14 Mb	Chr 5: 144.81 – 144.9 Mb
PubMed search
- Wikidata
View/Edit Human	View/Edit Mouse

E3 ubiquitin-protein ligase SMURF1 is an enzyme that in humans is encoded by the SMURF1 gene. The SMURF1 Gene encodes a protein with a size of 757 amino acids and the molecular mass of this protein is 86114 Da.

== Function ==
Smad ubiquitination regulatory factor 1 (Smurf1) is part of a gene that encodes a ubiquitin ligase and is specific for receptor-regulated SMAD proteins in the bone morphogenetic protein (BMP) pathway.

A similar protein in Xenopus is involved in embryonic pattern formation. Alternative splicing results in multiple transcript variants encoding different isoforms. An additional transcript variant has been identified, but its full length sequence has not been determined.

== HIV ==
The inhibition of HIV-1 replication in HeLa P4/R5 cells can be achieved by siRNA-mediated knockdown of SMURF1.

== Cancer ==
=== Breast ===
SMURF1 and SMURF2 have shown to exhibit E3 ligase-dependent and E3 ligase-independent activities in a multitude of different cell types whereby smurfs can act as tumor promoters or tumor suppressors by regulating biological tumorigenesis-related processes. Recent research in breast cancer explains a relationship between SMURF1 and ER alpha (Estrogen receptor alpha) during breast cancer growth. Since ER alpha is expressed in most breast cancers and is attributed to contributing to the progression of estrogen-dependent cancer, it has been supported that the reduction of SMURF1 decreases the proliferation of ER alpha-positive cells in vitro and in vivo. Thus, it is feasible that targeting SMURF1 may become a potential therapy for ER alpha-positive breast cancer.

=== Gastrointestinal ===
Smurf1 may the potential to act as an oncogenic factor in other essential organs of the body. For instance, high levels of SMURF1’s are linked to low survival rates of patients who are diagnosed with gastric cancer (GC) and clear cell renal cell carcinoma (ccRCC). Similarly to the suppression of SMURF1 to possibly treat breast cancer, the inhibition of Smurf1 can decrease tumorigenesis in various types of digestive cancer cell models like pancreatic and gastric cancers.

== Neurodegenerative Disorders ==
Continued research shows that SMURF1 can also been linked to various diseases. The downregulation of SMURF1 expression has been observed in neurodegenerative disorders such as Alzheimer's disease and Parkinson's disease. Research is showing that SMURF1 plays a role in neuronal necroptosis whereby the up-regulation of Smurf1 was observed in the brain cortex of adult rats who experienced neuroinflammation, and Smurf1 knockdown with siRNA inhibited neuronal necroptosis. This suggests that Smurf1 may promote neuronal necroptosis in neuroinflammatory conditions.

SMURF1 expression was increased in brain tissue samples from Parkinson's disease patients compared to controls, and that this increase was positively correlated with the accumulation of α-synuclein aggregates. Furthermore, the overexpression of SMURF1 in cultured cells led to increased levels of α-synuclein aggregates, while knockdown of SMURF1 reduced α-synuclein aggregation. In the context of neurodegeneration, SMURF1 has been implicated in the regulation of protein quality control mechanisms such as autophagy and the ubiquitin-proteasome system, which are critical for the clearance of misfolded or aggregated proteins that can contribute to disease pathogenesis.

While the exact mechanisms by which SMURF1 contributes to neurodegenerative disorders are still not fully understood, there is growing evidence, research studies may suggest that SMURF1 may be a potential target for therapeutic intervention in protein aggregation and improving cellular proteostasis in neurodegenerative diseases.

== Post Translational Modifications ==
Under the influence of NDFIP1, it undergoes auto-ubiquitination. The SMURF1 protein is modified by the SCF(FBXL15) complex at two lysine residues, Lys-381 and Lys-383, which leads to its degradation by the proteasome. Whereby, Lys-383 is the primary site of ubiquitination.

== Interactions ==
Smurfs are composed of several distinct domains that include an N-terminal C2 domain, two to three WW domains containing tryptophan residues, and an HECT domain. The C2 domain plays a crucial role in mediating the interaction of Smurfs with intracellular membranes. On the other hand, the WW domains of Smurfs are typically involved in protein-protein interactions, allowing them to interact with various target proteins. SMURF1 has been shown to interact with:

- ARHGEF9
- PLEKHO1
- SMURF2
- TRAF4
- Interacts with FBXL15 (via HECT domain)
- SMAD7
- TGFBR1
