= FBXO28 =

Protein-coding gene in humans

Identifiers
- Aliases: FBXO28, CENP-30, Fbx28, F-box protein 28, DEE100
- External IDs: OMIM: 609100; MGI: 1261890; GeneCards: FBXO28

Gene location (Human)
Chr.	Chromosome 1 (human)
Band	1q42.11	Start	224,114,111 bp
Band	1q42.11	End	224,162,047 bp

Gene location (Mouse)
Chr.	Chromosome 1 (mouse)
Band	1 H5|1 84.93 cM	Start	182,140,667 bp
Band	1 H5|1 84.93 cM	End	182,169,194 bp
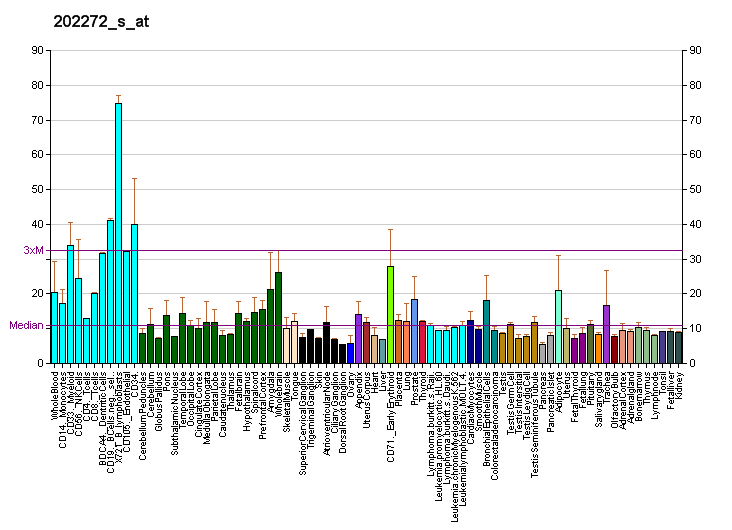

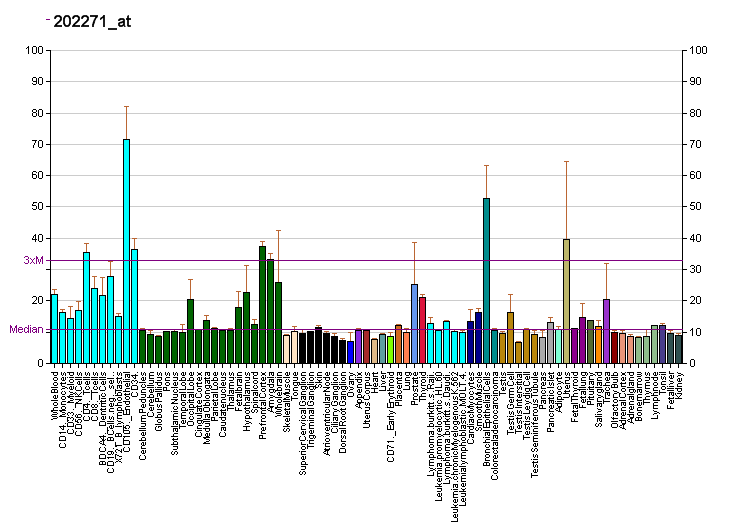
RNA expression pattern
Bgee	Human / Mouse (ortholog); Top expressed in: hair follicle; skin of thigh; Epithelium of choroid plexus; skin of hip; endothelial cell; kidney tubule; Achilles tendon; Brodmann area 23; tibia; germinal epithelium / Top expressed in: zygote; secondary oocyte; primary oocyte; external carotid artery; internal carotid artery; lacrimal gland; submandibular gland; motor neuron; parotid gland; retinal pigment epithelium; More reference expression data
BioGPS	More reference expression data
Orthologs
Databases	NCBI: entry; OMA: entry
Species	Human	Mouse
Entrez	23219	67948
Ensembl	ENSG00000143756	ENSMUSG00000047539
UniProt	Q9NVF7	Q8BIG4
RefSeq (mRNA)	NM_001136115; NM_015176	NM_175127
RefSeq (protein)	NP_001129587; NP_055991	NP_780336
Location (UCSC)	Chr 1: 224.11 – 224.16 Mb	Chr 1: 182.14 – 182.17 Mb
PubMed search
- Wikidata
View/Edit Human	View/Edit Mouse

F-box only protein 28 is a protein that in humans is encoded by the FBXO28 gene.

Members of the F-box protein family, such as FBXO28, are characterized by an approximately 40-amino acid F-box motif. SCF complexes, formed by SKP1 (MIM 601434), cullin (see CUL1; MIM 603134), and F-box proteins, act as protein-ubiquitin ligases. F-box proteins interact with SKP1 through the F box, and they interact with ubiquitination targets through other protein interaction domains (Jin et al., 2004).[supplied by OMIM]
