= HERC3 =

Protein-coding gene in the species Homo sapiens

Identifiers
- Aliases: HERC3, HECT and RLD domain containing E3 ubiquitin protein ligase 3
- External IDs: OMIM: 605200; MGI: 1921248; GeneCards: HERC3
Enzyme activity
EC #	BRENDA	ExPASy	KEGG	MetaCyc
2.3.2.26	↗	↗	↗	↗

Gene location (Mouse)
Chr.	Chromosome 6 (mouse)
Band	6|6 B3	Start	58,808,450 bp
Band	6|6 B3	End	58,897,383 bp
Gene ontology
Molecular function	transferase activity; ubiquitin-protein transferase activity; ubiquitin protein ligase activity
Cellular component	cytoplasmic vesicle; cytosol; cytoplasm
Biological process	protein ubiquitination
Sources:Amigo / QuickGO
Orthologs
Databases	NCBI: entry; OMA: entry
Species	Human	Mouse
Entrez	8916	73998
Ensembl	ENSG00000138641	ENSMUSG00000029804
UniProt	Q15034	n/a
RefSeq (mRNA)	NM_001271602; NM_014606; NM_001318505; NM_001375477; NM_001375478 NM_001375479; NM_001375480; NM_001375481; NM_001375482; NM_001375483	NM_028705; NM_001361966; NM_001361967
RefSeq (protein)	NP_001258531; NP_001305434; NP_055421; NP_001362406; NP_001362407 NP_001362408; NP_001362409; NP_001362410; NP_001362411; NP_001362412	n/a
Location (UCSC)	n/a	Chr 6: 58.81 – 58.9 Mb
PubMed search
- Wikidata
View/Edit Human	View/Edit Mouse

Probable E3 ubiquitin-protein ligase HERC3 is an enzyme that in humans is encoded by the HERC3 gene. The gene is a member of the HERC family of ubiquitin ligases and encodes a protein with a HECT domain and an RCC1-like domain (RLD). It binds ubiquitin and hPLIC-1/2 via its HECT domain. Alternatively spliced transcript variants encoding multiple isoforms have been observed, and mutations in this gene have been linked to colorectal and gastric carcinomas. The protein is localized in the cytosol and vesicular-like structures containing β-COP, ARF, and Rab5. Since HERC3 can itself be ubiquitinated and degraded by the proteasome, it likely has roles in both vesicular traffic and ubiquitin-dependent processes.
