= UBE4B =

Protein-coding gene in humans

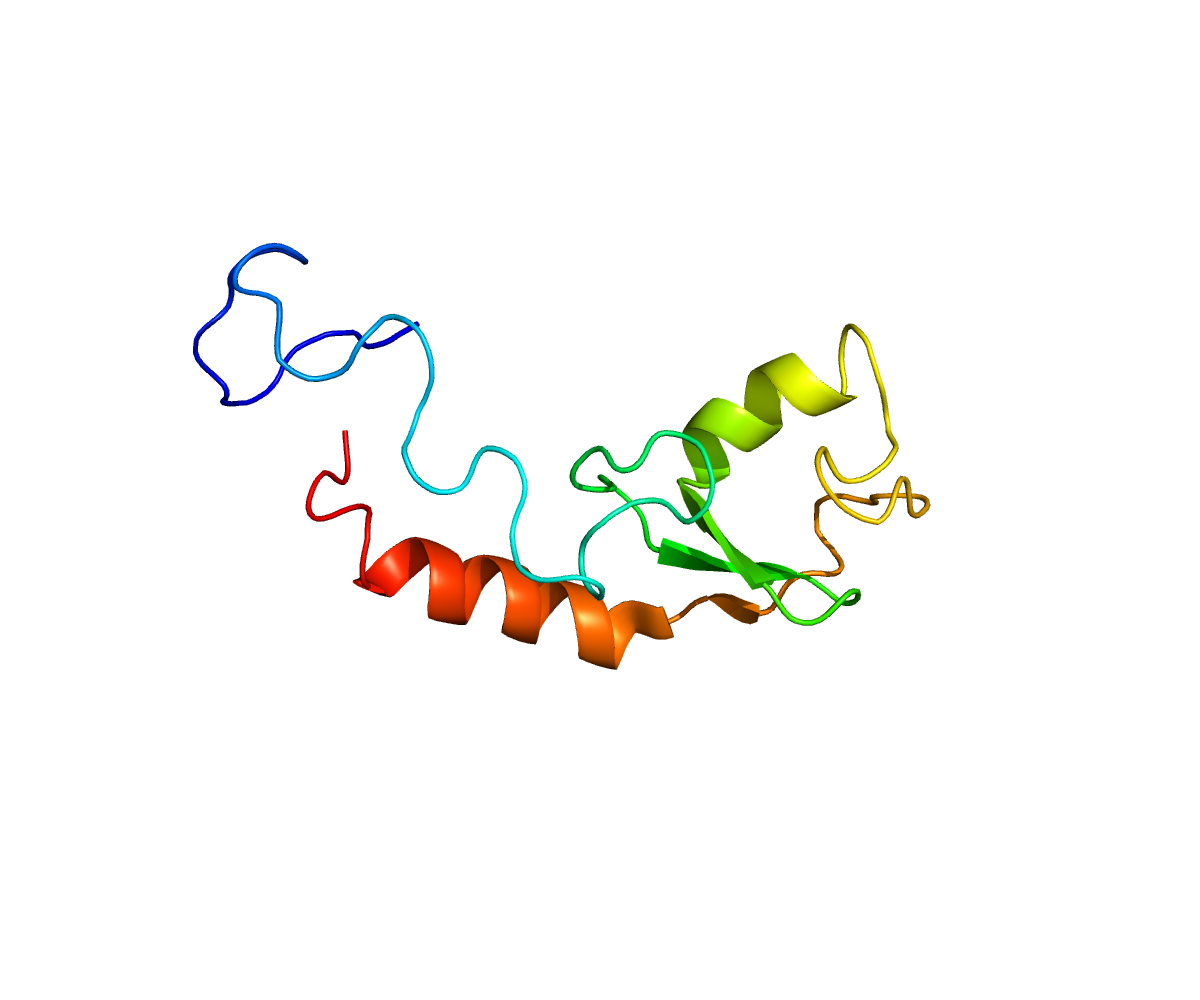

Identifiers
- Aliases: UBE4B, E4, HDNB1, UBOX3, UFD2, UFD2A, ubiquitination factor E4B
- External IDs: OMIM: 613565; MGI: 1927086; GeneCards: UBE4B
Available structures
PDB	Ortholog search: PDBe RCSB
PDB	List of PDB id codes 2KRE, 3L1X, 3L1Z
Enzyme activity
EC #	BRENDA	ExPASy	KEGG	MetaCyc
2.3.2.27	↗	↗	↗	↗

Gene location (Human)
Chr.	Chromosome 1 (human)
Band	1p36.22	Start	10,032,832 bp
Band	1p36.22	End	10,181,239 bp

Gene location (Mouse)
Chr.	Chromosome 4 (mouse)
Band	4 E2|4 79.08 cM	Start	149,328,416 bp
Band	4 E2|4 79.08 cM	End	149,426,749 bp
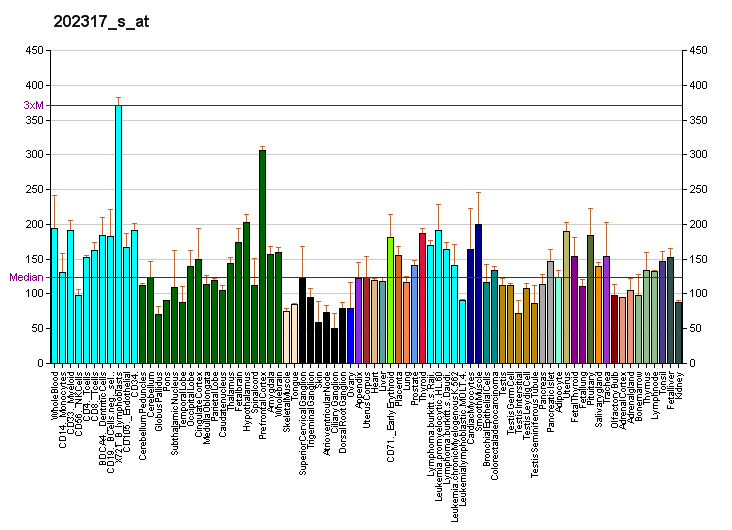

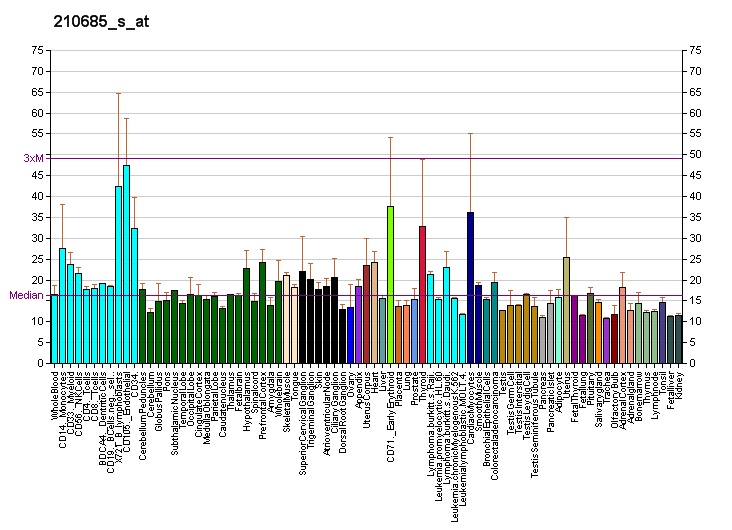

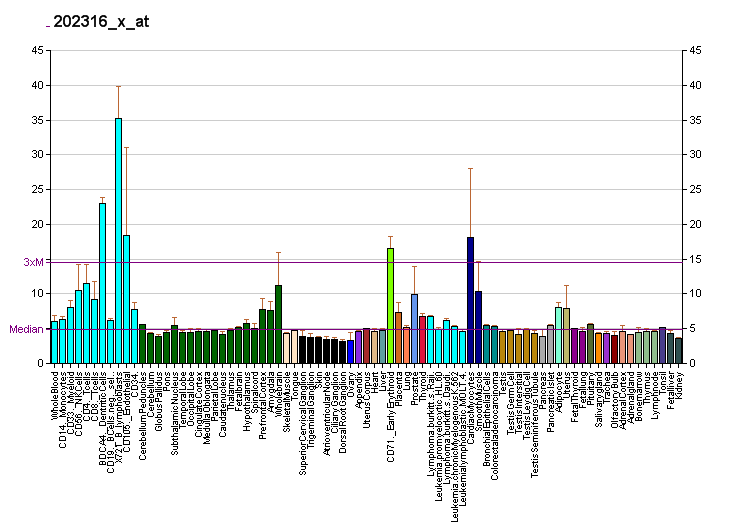
RNA expression pattern
Bgee	Human / Mouse (ortholog); Top expressed in: buccal mucosa cell; skin of thigh; hair follicle; cerebellar hemisphere; right hemisphere of cerebellum; gastric mucosa; gastrocnemius muscle; inferior olivary nucleus; Skeletal muscle tissue of rectus abdominis; right adrenal cortex / Top expressed in: tail of embryo; genital tubercle; secondary oocyte; zygote; internal carotid artery; external carotid artery; yolk sac; facial motor nucleus; renal corpuscle; ureter; More reference expression data
BioGPS	More reference expression data
Gene ontology
Molecular function	ubiquitin protein ligase activity; ATPase binding; ubiquitin-protein transferase activity; enzyme binding; ATP binding; transferase activity; ubiquitin-ubiquitin ligase activity; protein binding
Cellular component	ubiquitin ligase complex; nucleus; cytoplasm
Biological process	protein monoubiquitination; response to endoplasmic reticulum stress; ventricular trabecula myocardium morphogenesis; protein ubiquitination; neuron projection development; granzyme-mediated apoptotic signaling pathway; response to UV; proteasome-mediated ubiquitin-dependent protein catabolic process; protein autoubiquitination; protein polyubiquitination; ubiquitin-dependent ERAD pathway; ubiquitin-dependent protein catabolic process
Sources:Amigo / QuickGO
Orthologs
Databases	NCBI: entry; OMA: entry
Species	Human	Mouse
Entrez	10277	63958
Ensembl	ENSG00000130939	ENSMUSG00000028960
UniProt	O95155	Q9ES00
RefSeq (mRNA)	NM_001105562; NM_006048	NM_022022
RefSeq (protein)	NP_001099032; NP_006039	NP_071305; NP_001391797; NP_001391798
Location (UCSC)	Chr 1: 10.03 – 10.18 Mb	Chr 4: 149.33 – 149.43 Mb
PubMed search
- Wikidata
View/Edit Human	View/Edit Mouse

Ubiquitin conjugation factor E4 B is a protein that in humans is encoded by the UBE4B gene.

The modification of proteins with ubiquitin is an important cellular mechanism for targeting abnormal or short-lived proteins for degradation. Ubiquitination involves at least three classes of enzymes: ubiquitin-activating enzymes, or E1s, ubiquitin-conjugating enzymes, or E2s, and ubiquitin-protein ligases, or E3s.

This gene encodes an additional conjugation factor, E4, which is involved in multiubiquitin chain assembly. This gene is also the strongest candidate in the neuroblastoma tumor suppressor genes.
