= Ubiquitin-protein ligase E3B =

Protein-coding gene in Homo sapiens

UBE3B

Identifiers
- Aliases: UBE3B, BPIDS, KOS, ubiquitin protein ligase E3B
- External IDs: OMIM: 608047; MGI: 1891295; GeneCards: UBE3B
Enzyme activity
EC #	BRENDA	ExPASy	KEGG	MetaCyc
2.3.2.26	↗	↗	↗	↗

Gene location (Human)
Chr.	Chromosome 12 (human)
Band	12q24.11	Start	109,477,402 bp
Band	12q24.11	End	109,536,705 bp

Gene location (Mouse)
Chr.	Chromosome 5 (mouse)
Band	5|5 F	Start	114,518,668 bp
Band	5|5 F	End	114,559,230 bp
RNA expression pattern
Bgee	Human / Mouse (ortholog); Top expressed in: oocyte; secondary oocyte; frontal pole; endothelial cell; Brodmann area 10; paraflocculus of cerebellum; muscle of thigh; stromal cell of endometrium; gastrocnemius muscle; left ventricle / Top expressed in: muscle of thigh; triceps brachii muscle; ankle; skeletal muscle tissue; vastus lateralis muscle; interventricular septum; temporal muscle; sternocleidomastoid muscle; digastric muscle; medial head of gastrocnemius muscle; More reference expression data
BioGPS	n/a
Gene ontology
Molecular function	transferase activity; ubiquitin-protein transferase activity; ubiquitin protein ligase activity; ubiquitin conjugating enzyme activity
Cellular component	cytoplasm
Biological process	protein ubiquitination; protein polyubiquitination; ubiquitin-dependent protein catabolic process
Sources:Amigo / QuickGO
Orthologs
Databases	NCBI: entry; OMA: entry
Species	Human	Mouse
Entrez	89910	117146
Ensembl	ENSG00000151148	ENSMUSG00000029577
UniProt	Q7Z3V4	Q9ES34
RefSeq (mRNA)	NM_001270449; NM_001270450; NM_001270451; NM_130466; NM_183414 NM_183415	NM_054093; NM_001331219
RefSeq (protein)	NP_001257378; NP_001257379; NP_001257380; NP_569733; NP_904324	NP_001318148; NP_473434
Location (UCSC)	Chr 12: 109.48 – 109.54 Mb	Chr 5: 114.52 – 114.56 Mb
PubMed search
- Wikidata
View/Edit Human	View/Edit Mouse

Ubiquitin-Protein Ligase E3B (UBE3B) is an enzyme encoded by UBE3B gene in humans. UBE3B has an N-terminal IQ motif, which mediates calcium-independent calmodulin binding and a large C-terminal catalytic HECT domain.

== Discovery ==
UBE3B gene was discovered in 1996 by the group of Margaret Lomax at the University of Michigan Medical School. Differential mRNA expression study, to reveal genes upregulated after acoustic trauma in the chick basilar papilla, led to identification of cDNA which exhibited 84% of identity of uncharacterized human cDNA. Interestingly, its expression dramatically increased in the regions of damaged chick inner ear upon noise-induced trauma. In 2003, human and mouse UBE3B gene was cloned and characterized by its discoverers.

== Clinical significance ==
Inactivating mutations in UBE3B gene have been linked to Kaufman oculocerebrofacial syndrome (KOS), a severe developmental disorder. Most mutations are loss-of-function and lead to premature stop codon. However, some mutations are of single amino acid substitution type and these occur in the low complexity region, or in the catalytic HECT domain.

== Mouse models ==
Deletion of murine ortholog Ube3b leads to severe developmental delay in mice. The conventional knockout of Ube3b leads to a growth retardation, decreased grip strength, and loss of vocalization associated with the metabolic disease with nucleotide metabolism and the tricarboxylic acid cycle being the most affected. Such metabolic disturbances were also found in KOS patients. In this context, UBE3B ubiquitinated α-ketoacid dehydrogenase kinase (BCKDK). Forebrain-specific conditional Ube3b knockout mice showed impaired spatial learning, altered social interactions, and repetitive behaviors. Ube3b knockout neurons exhibited decreased dendritic branching, increased density and aberrant morphology of dendritic spines, altered synaptic physiology, and changes in hippocampal circuit activity. Dendritic and spine phenotype was regulated by Ube3b in a cell-autonomous manner. Murine Ube3b ubiquitinated the catalytic γ-subunit of calcineurin, Ppp3cc, the overexpression of which phenocopied Ube3b loss with regard to dendrite branching and dendritic spine density.
