= UBE4A =

Protein-coding gene in the species Homo sapiens

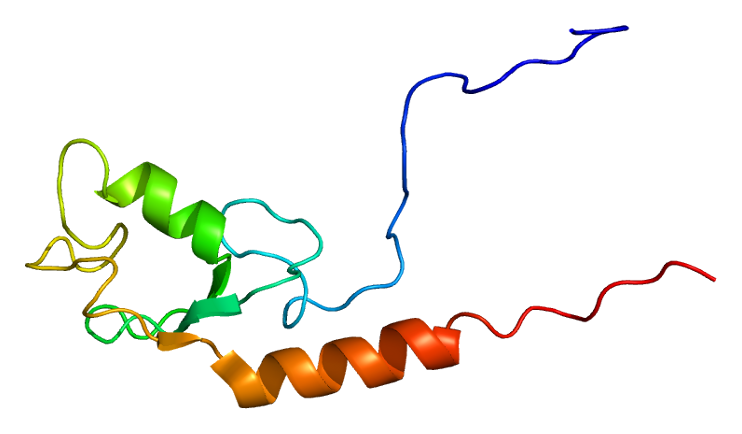

Identifiers
- Aliases: UBE4A, E4, UBOX2, UFD2, ubiquitination factor E4A, NEDHMS
- External IDs: OMIM: 603753; MGI: 2154580; GeneCards: UBE4A
Available structures
PDB	Ortholog search: PDBe RCSB
PDB	List of PDB id codes 1WGM
Enzyme activity
EC #	BRENDA	ExPASy	KEGG	MetaCyc
2.3.2.27	↗	↗	↗	↗

Gene location (Human)
Chr.	Chromosome 11 (human)
Band	11q23.3	Start	118,359,600 bp
Band	11q23.3	End	118,399,211 bp

Gene location (Mouse)
Chr.	Chromosome 9 (mouse)
Band	9|9 A5.2	Start	44,834,425 bp
Band	9|9 A5.2	End	44,876,898 bp
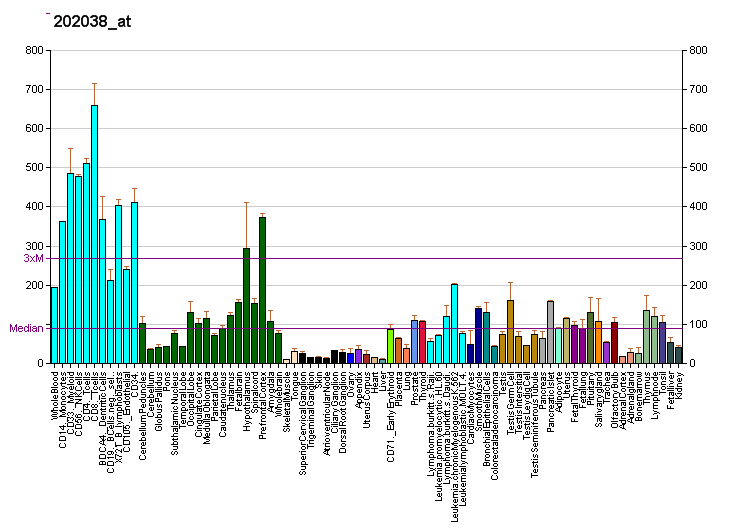
RNA expression pattern
Bgee	Human / Mouse (ortholog); Top expressed in: endothelial cell; Brodmann area 23; middle temporal gyrus; visceral pleura; parietal pleura; pons; skin of thigh; trigeminal ganglion; superior vestibular nucleus; inferior ganglion of vagus nerve / Top expressed in: muscle of thigh; neural layer of retina; genital tubercle; spermatocyte; ganglion of vagus nerve; granulocyte; zygote; tail of embryo; yolk sac; ventricular zone; More reference expression data
BioGPS	More reference expression data
Gene ontology
Molecular function	ubiquitin-protein transferase activity; protein binding; transferase activity; ubiquitin-ubiquitin ligase activity
Cellular component	ubiquitin ligase complex; nucleus; cytoplasm
Biological process	protein ubiquitination; ubiquitin-dependent protein catabolic process; ubiquitin-dependent ERAD pathway; protein polyubiquitination
Sources:Amigo / QuickGO
Orthologs
Databases	NCBI: entry; OMA: entry
Species	Human	Mouse
Entrez	9354	140630
Ensembl	ENSG00000110344	ENSMUSG00000059890
UniProt	Q14139	E9Q735
RefSeq (mRNA)	NM_004788; NM_001204077	NM_145400; NM_001346698; NM_001361075; NM_001361076
RefSeq (protein)	NP_001191006; NP_004779	NP_001333627; NP_663375; NP_001348004; NP_001348005
Location (UCSC)	Chr 11: 118.36 – 118.4 Mb	Chr 9: 44.83 – 44.88 Mb
PubMed search
- Wikidata
View/Edit Human	View/Edit Mouse

Ubiquitin conjugation factor E4 A is a protein that in humans is encoded by the UBE4A gene.

The modification of proteins with ubiquitin is an important cellular mechanism for targeting abnormal or short-lived proteins for degradation.

Ubiquitination involves at least three classes of enzymes: ubiquitin-activating enzymes, or E1s, ubiquitin-conjugating enzymes, or E2s, and ubiquitin-protein ligases, or E3s. This gene encodes an additional conjugation factor, E4, which is involved in multiubiquitin chain assembly.
