= AIMP1 =

Protein-coding gene in the species Homo sapiens

An Error has occurred retrieving Wikidata item for infobox Aminoacyl tRNA synthetase complex-interacting multifunctional protein 1 is a protein that in humans is encoded by the AIMP1 gene.

The protein encoded by this gene is a cytokine that may be induced by apoptosis and is also released from professional antigen-presenting cells such as dendritic cells. The release of this cytokine renders the tumor-associated vasculature sensitive to tumor necrosis factor. The precursor of SCYE1 (pro-SCYE1) is identical to the p43 subunit, which is associated with the multiaminoacyl-tRNA synthetase complex (mARS). Pro-SCYE1 may function in binding RNA as part of the tRNA synthetase complex in normal cells and in stimulating inflammatory responses after proteolytic cleavage in tumor cells. As an inflammatory cytokine, AIMp1/p43 has demonstrated the ability to skew T-helper polarization in the direction of Th-1, and its homozygous deletion leads to a hyper-polarized Th-2 phenotype.

== Interactions ==
SCYE1 has been shown to interact with SMURF2.
