= Kaufman oculocerebrofacial syndrome =

- Other names: Blepharophimosis-ptosis-intellectual disability syndrome
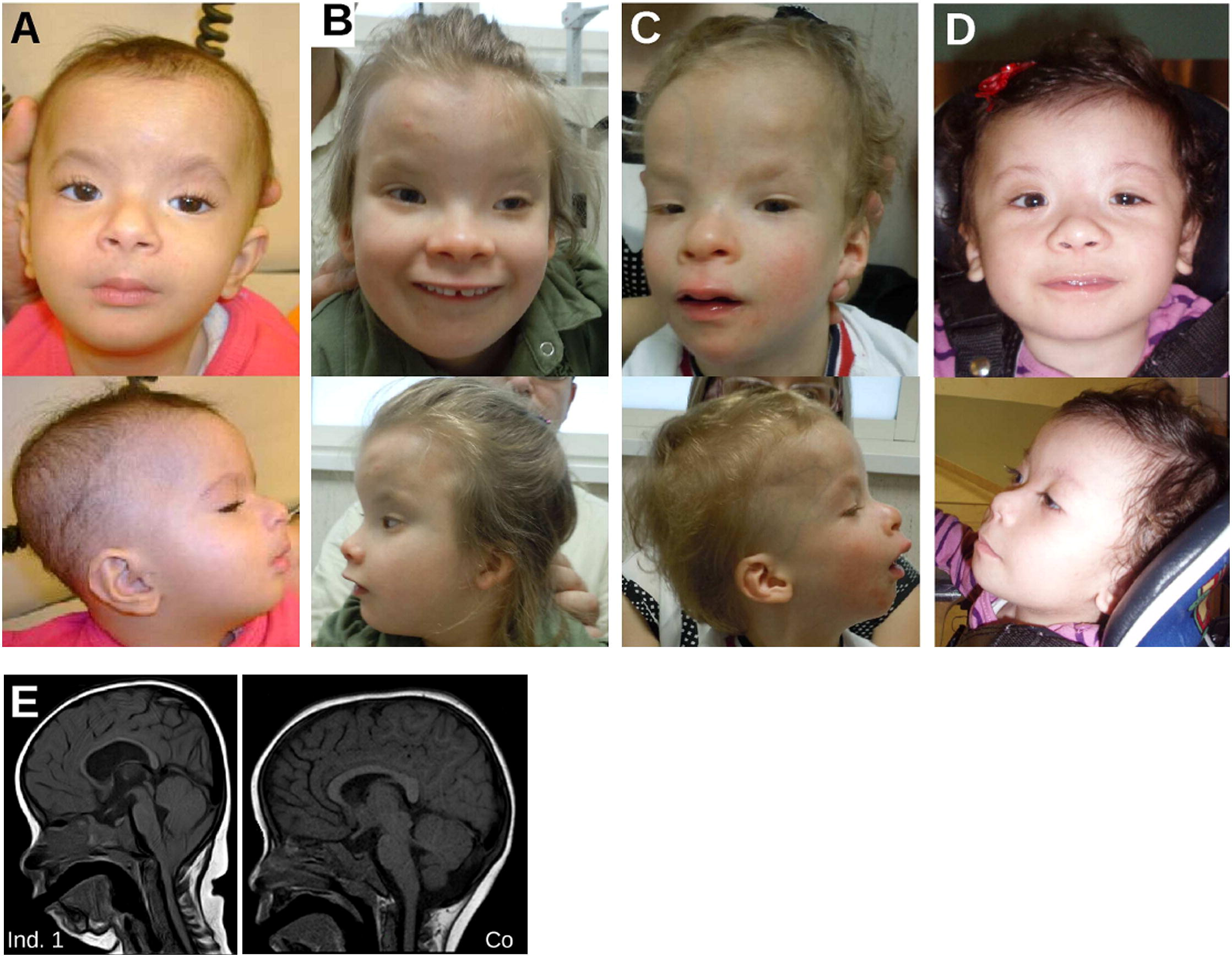
- This photo shows patients with Kaufman oculocerebrofacial syndrome, who have typical facial features, such as: blepharophimosis and droopy eyelid, sparse hair, sparse and arched eyebrows, elongated philtrum, anteverted nostrils, receding lower jaw, and low-set and posteriorly angulated ears rotated ears. Individuals 2 (B) and 3 (C) also have upward-slanted palpebral fissures. In picture E, the photo shows an MRI of individual 1 (A) that has Chiari I malformation, a small corpus callosum, and microcephaly.
- Symptoms: Arachnodactyly
- Causes: Mutation in the UBE3B gene
- Diagnostic method: Growth assessment, Thyroid function evaluation
- Treatment: Thyroid hormone replacement, Speech therapy

Kaufman oculocerebrofacial syndrome, also known as blepharophimosis-ptosis-intellectual disability syndrome, is an extremely rare autosomal recessive congenital disorder characterized by severe intellectual disability, brachycephaly, upslanting palpebral fissures, eye abnormalities, and highly arched palate. It was characterized in 1971; eight cases had been identified as of 1995. To date, the number of cases is disputed, with sources claiming the number ranges from 14 to 31.

== Symptoms and signs ==
The signs and symptoms of Kaufman oculocerebrofacial syndrome are consistent with the following:

- High palate
- Microcephaly
- Constipation
- Intellectual disability
- Muscular hypotonia
- Nystagmus

== Cause ==
The cause of this condition is apparently due to mutation in the UBE3B gene and is inherited via autosomal recessive manner. This gene is located at molecular location- base pairs 109,477,410 to 109,543,628 and position 24.11 on chromosome 12.

== Genetics ==
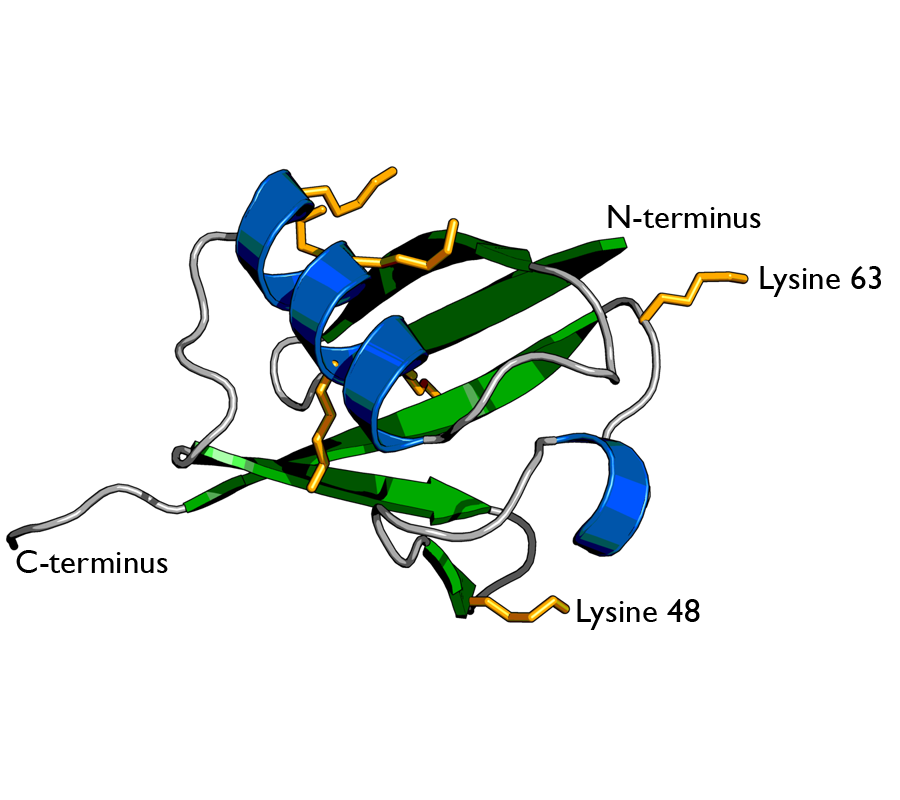
Ubiquitin protein

The mechanism (or pathogenesis) of Kaufman oculocerebrofacial syndrome appears to begin due to a mutation in the E3 ubiquitin protein ligase. (UBE3B).

One finds that the normal mechanism of UBE3B gene is important in the ubiquitin-proteasome system. The aforementioned system helps to remove proteins that have degraded.

However, when not working properly due to the mutation in the UBE3B gene(at least 15 mutations) results in an unstable UBE3B protein which has a negative effect on the ubiquitin-proteasome system.

== Diagnosis ==
Smith–Lemli–Opitz syndrome(or 7-dehydrocholesterol reductase deficiency)

The diagnosis of Kaufman oculocerebrofacial syndrome can be achieved via molecular testing approaches. Additionally to ascertain if the individual has the condition:

- Growth assessment
- Thyroid function evaluation
- Kidney ultrasound
- Echocardiogram

=== Differential diagnosis ===
Kaufman oculocerebrofacial syndrome differential diagnosis consists of:

- Ohdo syndrome
- Smith–Lemli–Opitz syndrome
- Maat–Kievit–Brunner syndrome
- Chromosome 3pter-p25 deletion syndrome

== Management ==
Treatment for this condition entails surveillance of growth and contractures. Furthermore, the following are treatment options:

- Thyroid hormone replacement
- Speech therapy
- Hearing aids

== See also ==
- Ubiquitin
