= PLEKHO1 =

Protein-coding gene in humans

Identifiers
- Aliases: PLEKHO1, CKIP-1, OC120, CKIP1, JBP, pleckstrin homology domain containing O1
- External IDs: OMIM: 608335; MGI: 1914470; GeneCards: PLEKHO1
Available structures
PDB	Ortholog search: PDBe RCSB
PDB	List of PDB id codes 3AA1

Gene location (Human)
Chr.	Chromosome 1 (human)
Band	1q21.2	Start	150,149,183 bp
Band	1q21.2	End	150,164,720 bp

Gene location (Mouse)
Chr.	Chromosome 3 (mouse)
Band	3|3 F2.1	Start	95,895,741 bp
Band	3|3 F2.1	End	95,903,313 bp
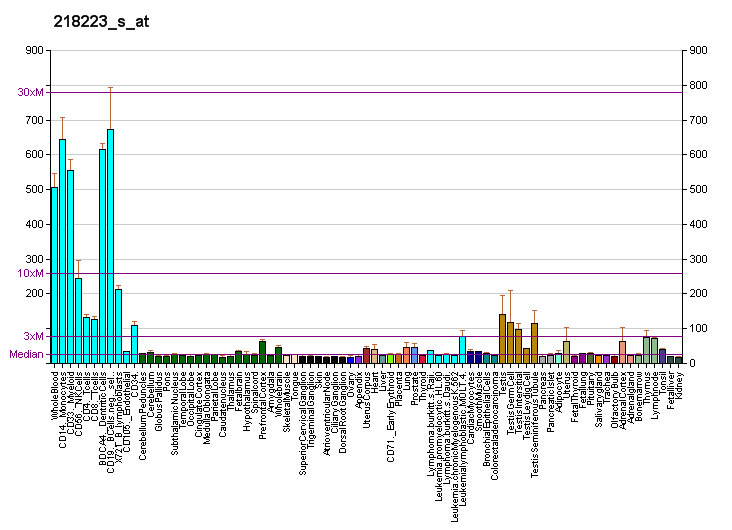
RNA expression pattern
Bgee	Human / Mouse (ortholog); Top expressed in: monocyte; gastric mucosa; granulocyte; muscle layer of sigmoid colon; left testis; right testis; popliteal artery; tibial arteries; right coronary artery; ganglionic eminence / Top expressed in: genital tubercle; tail of embryo; ventricular zone; decidua; gastrula; ganglionic eminence; superior frontal gyrus; primary visual cortex; cerebellar cortex; internal carotid artery; More reference expression data
BioGPS	More reference expression data
Gene ontology
Molecular function	protein binding
Cellular component	cytoplasm; ruffle membrane; plasma membrane; muscle cell projection membrane; membrane; nucleus
Biological process	myoblast migration; myoblast fusion; lamellipodium morphogenesis; regulation of cell shape
Sources:Amigo / QuickGO
Orthologs
Databases	NCBI: entry; OMA: entry
Species	Human	Mouse
Entrez	51177	67220
Ensembl	ENSG00000023902	ENSMUSG00000015745
UniProt	Q53GL0	Q9JIY0
RefSeq (mRNA)	NM_016274; NM_001304722; NM_001304723; NM_001304724	NM_023320
RefSeq (protein)	NP_001291651; NP_001291652; NP_001291653; NP_057358	NP_075809
Location (UCSC)	Chr 1: 150.15 – 150.16 Mb	Chr 3: 95.9 – 95.9 Mb
PubMed search
- Wikidata
View/Edit Human	View/Edit Mouse

Pleckstrin homology domain-containing family O member 1 is a protein that in humans is encoded by the PLEKHO1 gene.

== Interactions ==
PLEKHO1 has been shown to interact with Casein kinase 2, alpha 1 and SMURF1.
