= RNF167 =

Protein-coding gene in the species Homo sapiens

Identifiers
- Aliases: RNF167, 5730408C10Rik, RING105, LP2254, ring finger protein 167
- External IDs: OMIM: 610431; MGI: 1917760; GeneCards: RNF167
Enzyme activity
EC #	BRENDA	ExPASy	KEGG	MetaCyc
2.3.2.27	↗	↗	↗	↗

Gene location (Human)
Chr.	Chromosome 17 (human)
Band	17p13.2	Start	4,940,008 bp
Band	17p13.2	End	4,945,222 bp

Gene location (Mouse)
Chr.	Chromosome 11 (mouse)
Band	11|11 B3	Start	70,538,061 bp
Band	11|11 B3	End	70,542,247 bp
RNA expression pattern
Bgee	Human / Mouse (ortholog); Top expressed in: granulocyte; apex of heart; mucosa of transverse colon; left testis; right testis; muscle layer of sigmoid colon; right lobe of thyroid gland; anterior pituitary; skin of abdomen; right hemisphere of cerebellum / Top expressed in: granulocyte; thymus; lactiferous gland; lip; spleen; right lung; mesenteric lymph nodes; right lung lobe; neural layer of retina; duodenum; More reference expression data
BioGPS	n/a
Gene ontology
Molecular function	zinc ion binding; protein binding; metal ion binding; ubiquitin-protein transferase activity; transferase activity; ubiquitin protein ligase activity
Cellular component	cytoplasm; integral component of membrane; membrane; endomembrane system
Biological process	negative regulation of cell cycle; protein polyubiquitination; protein ubiquitination; ubiquitin-dependent protein catabolic process
Sources:Amigo / QuickGO
Orthologs
Databases	NCBI: entry; OMA: entry
Species	Human	Mouse
Entrez	26001	70510
Ensembl	ENSG00000108523	ENSMUSG00000040746
UniProt	Q9H6Y7	Q91XF4
RefSeq (mRNA)	NM_015528; NM_001320356; NM_001320357; NM_001320358; NM_001320359 NM_001320360; NM_001320361; NM_001320362; NM_001320363; NM_001320364; NM_001320365; NM_001370303; NM_001370304; NM_001370305; NM_001370306; NM_001370307; NM_001370308; NM_001370311; NM_001370313; NM_001375485	NM_027445; NM_001316728; NM_001363134
RefSeq (protein)	NP_001307285; NP_001307286; NP_001307287; NP_001307288; NP_001307289 NP_001307290; NP_001307291; NP_001307292; NP_001307293; NP_001307294; NP_056343; NP_001357232; NP_001357233; NP_001357234; NP_001357235; NP_001357236; NP_001357237; NP_001357240; NP_001357242; NP_001362414	NP_001303657; NP_081721; NP_001350063
Location (UCSC)	Chr 17: 4.94 – 4.95 Mb	Chr 11: 70.54 – 70.54 Mb
PubMed search
- Wikidata
View/Edit Human	View/Edit Mouse

Ring finger protein 167 is a protein that in humans is encoded by the RNF167 gene.

== Function ==
RNF167 is an E3 ubiquitin ligase that interacts with TSSC5 (SLC22A18; MIM 602631) and, together with UBCH6 (UBE2E1; MIM 602916), facilitates TSSC5 polyubiquitylation.
