= HECTD4 =

Identifiers
- Aliases: HECTD4, C12orf51, POTAGE, HECT domain E3 ubiquitin protein ligase 4, HEEL, C12ord51
- External IDs: MGI: 3647820; GeneCards: HECTD4
Enzyme activity
EC #	BRENDA	ExPASy	KEGG	MetaCyc
2.3.2.26	↗	↗	↗	↗

Gene location (Human)
Chr.	Chromosome 12 (human)
Band	12q24.13	Start	112,160,188 bp
Band	12q24.13	End	112,382,439 bp

Gene location (Mouse)
Chr.	Chromosome 5 (mouse)
Band	5|5 F	Start	121,358,282 bp
Band	5|5 F	End	121,506,640 bp
RNA expression pattern
Bgee	Human / Mouse (ortholog); Top expressed in: right hemisphere of cerebellum; middle temporal gyrus; ganglionic eminence; Brodmann area 23; paraflocculus of cerebellum; cerebellar vermis; right frontal lobe; primary visual cortex; Brodmann area 9; prefrontal cortex / Top expressed in: superior cervical ganglion; medial dorsal nucleus; visual cortex; subiculum; piriform cortex; central gray substance of midbrain; medial geniculate nucleus; primary visual cortex; superior colliculus; inferior colliculi; More reference expression data
BioGPS	n/a
Gene ontology
Molecular function	transferase activity; ubiquitin-protein transferase activity; ubiquitin protein ligase activity
Cellular component	integral component of membrane; membrane; cytoplasm
Biological process	protein ubiquitination; glucose homeostasis; glucose metabolic process
Sources:Amigo / QuickGO
Orthologs
Databases	NCBI: entry; OMA: entry
Species	Human	Mouse
Entrez	283450	269700
Ensembl	ENSG00000173064	ENSMUSG00000042744
UniProt	Q9Y4D8	n/a
RefSeq (mRNA)	NM_173813; NM_001109662; NM_001388303	NM_181421
RefSeq (protein)	NP_001103132	n/a
Location (UCSC)	Chr 12: 112.16 – 112.38 Mb	Chr 5: 121.36 – 121.51 Mb
PubMed search
- Wikidata
View/Edit Human	View/Edit Mouse

HECT domain E3 ubiquitin protein ligase 4 is a protein that in humans is encoded by the HECTD4 gene.
