= SMURF2 =

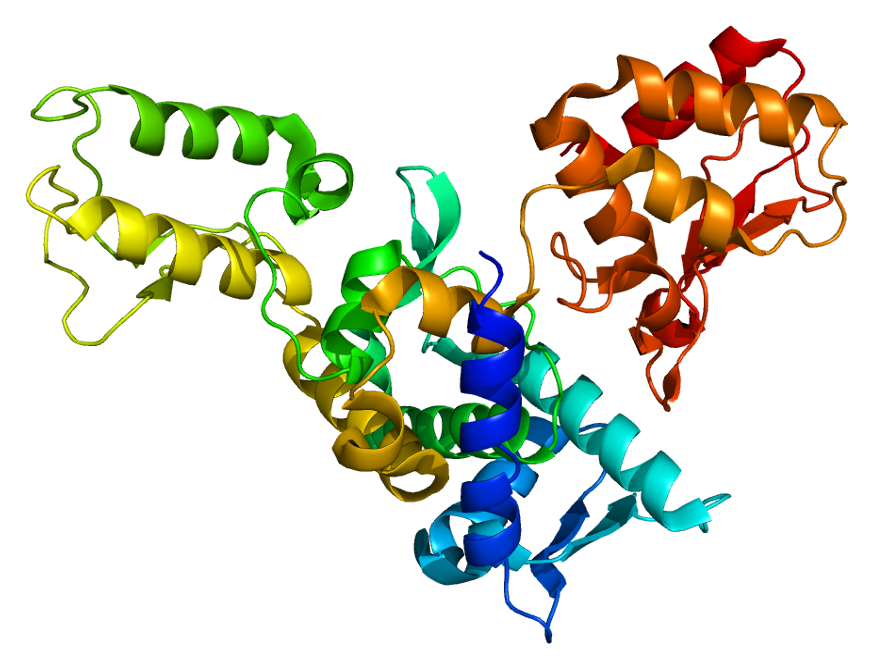

Identifiers
- Aliases: SMURF2, SMAD specific E3 ubiquitin protein ligase 2
- External IDs: OMIM: 605532; MGI: 1913563; GeneCards: SMURF2
Available structures
PDB	Ortholog search: PDBe RCSB
PDB	List of PDB id codes 1ZVD, 2DJY, 2JQZ, 2KXQ, 2LTZ
Enzyme activity
EC #	BRENDA	ExPASy	KEGG	MetaCyc
2.3.2.26	↗	↗	↗	↗

Gene location (Human)
Chr.	Chromosome 17 (human)
Band	17q23.3-q24.1	Start	64,542,282 bp
Band	17q23.3-q24.1	End	64,662,307 bp

Gene location (Mouse)
Chr.	Chromosome 11 (mouse)
Band	11|11 E1	Start	106,710,892 bp
Band	11|11 E1	End	106,811,541 bp
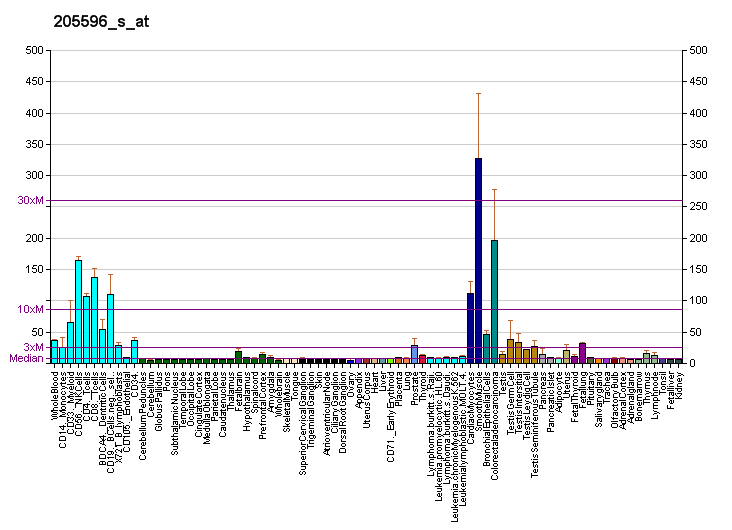
RNA expression pattern
Bgee	Human / Mouse (ortholog); Top expressed in: buccal mucosa cell; secondary oocyte; amniotic fluid; pylorus; saphenous vein; lactiferous duct; visceral pleura; pericardium; caput epididymis; Achilles tendon / Top expressed in: hand; otolith organ; utricle; secondary oocyte; zygote; left lung lobe; right lung lobe; endothelial cell of lymphatic vessel; genital tubercle; superior cervical ganglion; More reference expression data
BioGPS	More reference expression data
Gene ontology
Molecular function	protein binding; identical protein binding; ubiquitin-protein transferase activity; transferase activity; ubiquitin protein ligase activity; transforming growth factor beta receptor binding; SMAD binding
Cellular component	cytosol; membrane; ubiquitin ligase complex; plasma membrane; nucleoplasm; membrane raft; nuclear speck; nucleus; cytoplasm
Biological process	positive regulation of canonical Wnt signaling pathway; negative regulation of transcription by RNA polymerase II; negative regulation of transforming growth factor beta receptor signaling pathway; BMP signaling pathway; positive regulation of trophoblast cell migration; ubiquitin-dependent SMAD protein catabolic process; regulation of transforming growth factor beta receptor signaling pathway; protein ubiquitination; negative regulation of transcription, DNA-templated; protein polyubiquitination; Wnt signaling pathway, planar cell polarity pathway; protein deubiquitination; ubiquitin-dependent protein catabolic process; negative regulation of BMP signaling pathway; proteasome-mediated ubiquitin-dependent protein catabolic process; positive regulation of protein catabolic process
Sources:Amigo / QuickGO
Orthologs
Databases	NCBI: entry; OMA: entry
Species	Human	Mouse
Entrez	64750	66313
Ensembl	ENSG00000108854	ENSMUSG00000018363
UniProt	Q9HAU4	A2A5Z6
RefSeq (mRNA)	NM_022739	NM_025481; NM_001362894
RefSeq (protein)	NP_073576	NP_079757; NP_001349823
Location (UCSC)	Chr 17: 64.54 – 64.66 Mb	Chr 11: 106.71 – 106.81 Mb
PubMed search
- Wikidata
View/Edit Human	View/Edit Mouse

E3 ubiquitin-protein ligase SMURF2 is an enzyme that in humans is encoded by the SMURF2 gene which is located at chromosome 17q23.3-q24.1.

== Interactions ==
SMURF2 has been shown to interact with:

- Mothers against decapentaplegic homolog 1,
- Mothers against decapentaplegic homolog 2,
- Mothers against decapentaplegic homolog 3,
- Mothers against decapentaplegic homolog 7,
- SCYE1,
- SMURF1, and
- Ubiquitin C.
- TOP2A,
