= MON2 =

Protein-coding gene in the species Homo sapiens

Identifiers
- Aliases: MON2, MON2 homolog, regulator of endosome-to-Golgi trafficking
- External IDs: OMIM: 616822; MGI: 1914324; GeneCards: MON2

Gene location (Human)
Chr.	Chromosome 12 (human)
Band	12q14.1	Start	62,466,817 bp
Band	12q14.1	End	62,600,476 bp

Gene location (Mouse)
Chr.	Chromosome 10 (mouse)
Band	10|10 D2	Start	122,827,965 bp
Band	10|10 D2	End	122,912,410 bp
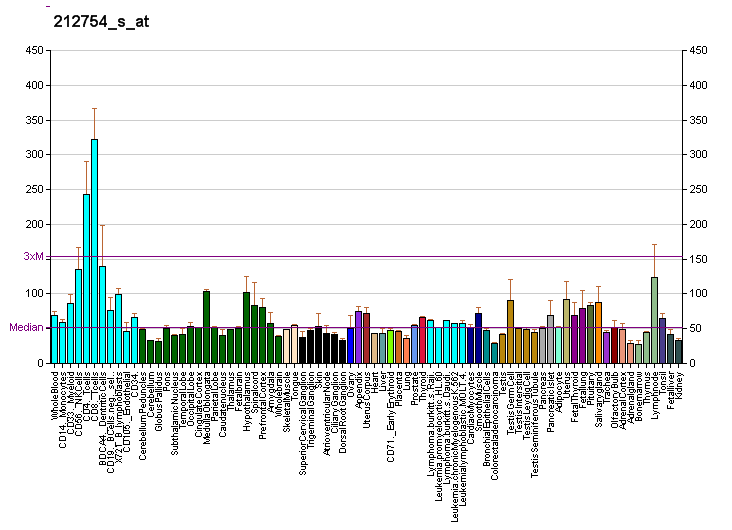
RNA expression pattern
Bgee	Human / Mouse (ortholog); Top expressed in: body of pancreas; tibia; Achilles tendon; mucosa of paranasal sinus; tibial nerve; corpus callosum; right uterine tube; skin of leg; left ovary; skin of abdomen / Top expressed in: stroma of bone marrow; calvaria; lacrimal gland; hand; granulocyte; parotid gland; lip; foot; deep cerebellar nuclei; otolith organ; More reference expression data
BioGPS	More reference expression data
Gene ontology
Molecular function	protein binding
Cellular component	extracellular exosome; cytosol
Biological process	protein transport; Golgi to endosome transport; transport
Sources:Amigo / QuickGO
Orthologs
Databases	NCBI: entry; OMA: entry
Species	Human	Mouse
Entrez	23041	67074
Ensembl	ENSG00000061987	ENSMUSG00000034602
UniProt	Q7Z3U7	Q80TL7
RefSeq (mRNA)	NM_001278469; NM_001278470; NM_001278471; NM_001278472; NM_015026	NM_001163024; NM_001163025; NM_153395
RefSeq (protein)	NP_001265398; NP_001265399; NP_001265400; NP_001265401; NP_055841 NP_001265400.1	NP_001156496; NP_001156497; NP_700444
Location (UCSC)	Chr 12: 62.47 – 62.6 Mb	Chr 10: 122.83 – 122.91 Mb
PubMed search
- Wikidata
View/Edit Human	View/Edit Mouse

Protein MON2 homolog is a protein that in humans is encoded by the MON2 gene.
