= MORC3 =

Protein-coding gene in the species Homo sapiens

Identifiers
- Aliases: MORC3, NXP2, ZCW5, ZCWCC3, MORC family CW-type zinc finger 3
- External IDs: OMIM: 610078; MGI: 2136841; GeneCards: MORC3
Available structures
PDB	Ortholog search: PDBe RCSB
PDB	List of PDB id codes 4QQ4

Gene location (Human)
Chr.	Chromosome 21 (human)
Band	21q22.12	Start	36,320,189 bp
Band	21q22.12	End	36,386,148 bp

Gene location (Mouse)
Chr.	Chromosome 16 (mouse)
Band	16|16 C4	Start	93,629,009 bp
Band	16|16 C4	End	93,672,961 bp
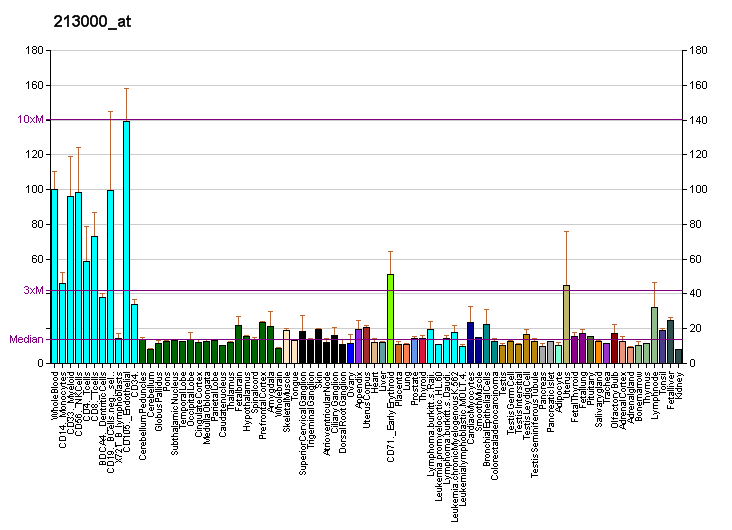
RNA expression pattern
Bgee	Human / Mouse (ortholog); Top expressed in: Achilles tendon; paraflocculus of cerebellum; middle frontal gyrus; epithelium of nasopharynx; epithelium of colon; Brodmann area 10; mucosa of paranasal sinus; frontal pole; gingival epithelium; palpebral conjunctiva / Top expressed in: spermatocyte; primitive streak; lymph node; otic placode; mesenteric lymph nodes; granulocyte; tail of embryo; genital tubercle; conjunctival fornix; otic vesicle; More reference expression data
BioGPS	More reference expression data
Gene ontology
Molecular function	zinc ion binding; metal ion binding; RNA binding; protein binding
Cellular component	nuclear matrix; PML body; nucleus; nucleoplasm
Biological process	protein phosphorylation; protein stabilization; viral process; negative regulation of fibroblast proliferation; post-embryonic development; peptidyl-serine phosphorylation; maintenance of protein location in nucleus
Sources:Amigo / QuickGO
Orthologs
Databases	NCBI: entry; OMA: entry
Species	Human	Mouse
Entrez	23515	338467
Ensembl	ENSG00000159256	ENSMUSG00000039456
UniProt	Q14149	F7BJB9
RefSeq (mRNA)	NM_015358; NM_001320445; NM_001320446	NM_001045529
RefSeq (protein)	NP_001307374; NP_001307375; NP_056173	NP_001038994
Location (UCSC)	Chr 21: 36.32 – 36.39 Mb	Chr 16: 93.63 – 93.67 Mb
PubMed search
- Wikidata
View/Edit Human	View/Edit Mouse

MORC family CW-type zinc finger protein 3 is a protein that in humans is encoded by the MORC3 gene.

This gene encodes a protein that localizes to the nuclear matrix. The protein also has RNA binding activity, and has a predicted coiled-coil domain.

== See also ==
- Zinc finger
