= CIB1 =

Protein-coding gene in humans

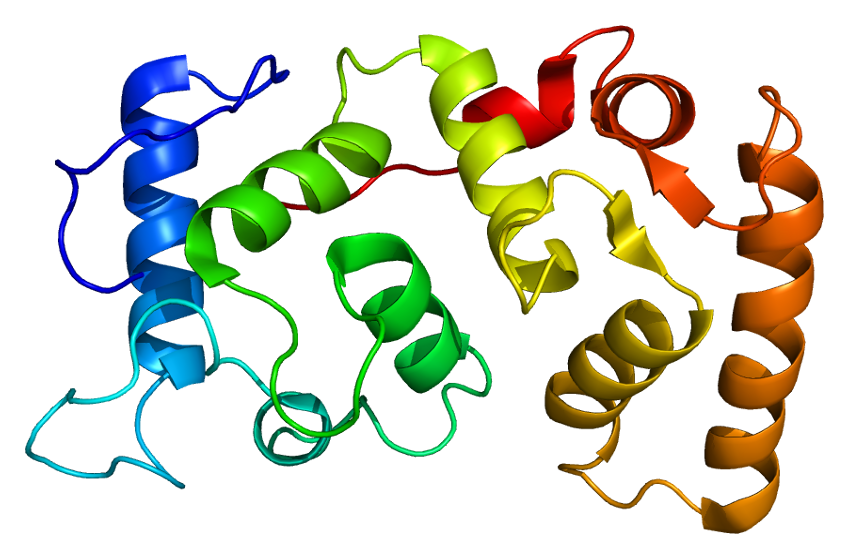

Identifiers
- Aliases: CIB1, CIB, CIBP, KIP1, PRKDCIP, SIP2-28, calcium and integrin binding 1
- External IDs: OMIM: 602293; MGI: 1344418; GeneCards: CIB1
Available structures
PDB	Ortholog search: PDBe RCSB
PDB	List of PDB id codes 1DGU, 1DGV, 1XO5, 1Y1A, 2L4H, 2L4I, 2LM5

Gene location (Human)
Chr.	Chromosome 15 (human)
Band	15q26.1	Start	90,229,975 bp
Band	15q26.1	End	90,234,047 bp

Gene location (Mouse)
Chr.	Chromosome 7 (mouse)
Band	7|7 D2	Start	79,876,895 bp
Band	7|7 D2	End	79,882,561 bp
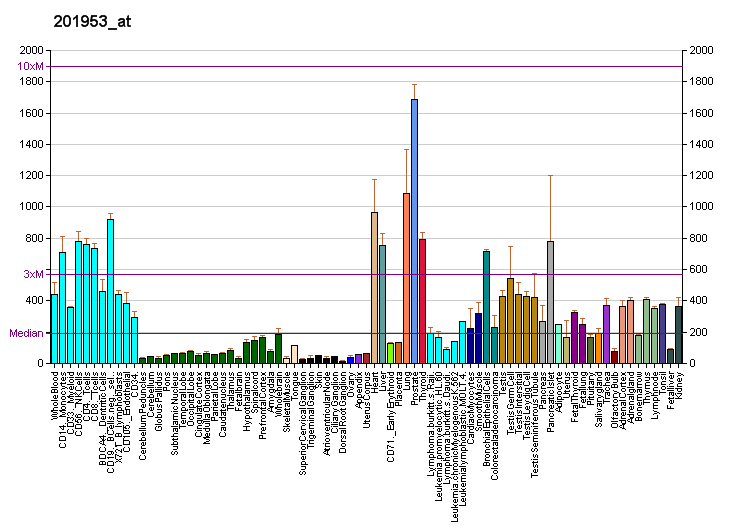
RNA expression pattern
Bgee	Human / Mouse (ortholog); Top expressed in: bronchial epithelial cell; mucosa of transverse colon; right uterine tube; olfactory zone of nasal mucosa; body of pancreas; nasal epithelium; granulocyte; right adrenal gland; left adrenal gland; left adrenal cortex / Top expressed in: spermatocyte; spermatid; right kidney; duodenum; epithelium of stomach; yolk sac; pyloric antrum; jejunum; crypt of lieberkuhn of small intestine; seminiferous tubule; More reference expression data
BioGPS	More reference expression data
Gene ontology
Molecular function	protein serine/threonine kinase inhibitor activity; calcium ion binding; protein-membrane adaptor activity; transmembrane transporter binding; metal ion binding; protein C-terminus binding; protein binding; calcium-dependent protein kinase inhibitor activity; protein kinase binding
Cellular component	cytoplasm; vesicle; Golgi apparatus; cell projection; centrosome; membrane; growth cone; plasma membrane; nucleoplasm; microtubule organizing center; ruffle membrane; axon; filopodium tip; dendrite; soma; apical plasma membrane; endoplasmic reticulum; perinuclear region of cytoplasm; neuron projection; sarcolemma; extracellular exosome; cytoskeleton; nucleus; cell periphery; lamellipodium
Biological process	negative regulation of protein phosphorylation; positive regulation of protein targeting to membrane; thrombopoietin-mediated signaling pathway; negative regulation of protein kinase B signaling; cell differentiation; cellular response to nerve growth factor stimulus; positive regulation of protein phosphorylation; negative regulation of neuron projection development; regulation of cell division; positive regulation of cell migration involved in sprouting angiogenesis; extrinsic apoptotic signaling pathway; positive regulation of cell-matrix adhesion; positive regulation of cell migration; cellular response to growth factor stimulus; cellular response to tumor necrosis factor; platelet formation; negative regulation of apoptotic process; negative regulation of megakaryocyte differentiation; positive regulation of protein serine/threonine kinase activity; positive regulation of calcineurin-NFAT signaling cascade; cell division; cellular response to DNA damage stimulus; negative regulation of microtubule depolymerization; positive regulation of substrate adhesion-dependent cell spreading; positive regulation of cell growth; response to ischemia; cell adhesion; regulation of cell population proliferation; positive regulation of NF-kappaB transcription factor activity; double-strand break repair; angiogenesis; spermatogenesis; positive regulation of cell population proliferation; spermatid development; positive regulation of ERK1 and ERK2 cascade; cytoplasmic microtubule organization; endomitotic cell cycle; cell cycle; positive regulation of cell adhesion mediated by integrin; positive regulation of male germ cell proliferation; negative regulation of cell population proliferation; apoptotic process; positive regulation of catalytic activity; negative regulation of protein kinase activity; negative regulation of protein serine/threonine kinase activity; positive regulation of protein localization to plasma membrane
Sources:Amigo / QuickGO
Orthologs
Databases	NCBI: entry; OMA: entry
Species	Human	Mouse
Entrez	10519	23991
Ensembl	ENSG00000185043	ENSMUSG00000030538
UniProt	Q99828	Q9Z0F4
RefSeq (mRNA)	NM_001277764; NM_006384	NM_001291275; NM_001291276; NM_011870
RefSeq (protein)	NP_001264693; NP_006375	NP_001278204; NP_001278205; NP_036000
Location (UCSC)	Chr 15: 90.23 – 90.23 Mb	Chr 7: 79.88 – 79.88 Mb
PubMed search
- Wikidata
View/Edit Human	View/Edit Mouse

Calcium and integrin-binding protein 1 is a protein that in humans is encoded by the CIB1 gene and is located in chromosome 15. The protein encoded by this gene is a member of the calcium-binding protein family. The specific function of this protein has not yet been determined; however this protein is known to interact with DNA-dependent protein kinase and may play a role in kinase-phosphatase regulation of DNA end-joining. This protein also interacts with integrin alpha(IIb)beta(3), which may implicate this protein as a regulatory molecule for alpha(IIb)beta(3).

== Structure ==
CIB1 is a small protein with a molecular weight of approximately 22 kDa. It has a conserved calcium-binding EF hand domain, which consists of two alpha-helices connected by a loop. CIB1 also has an integrin-binding domain, located near the N-terminus of the protein. In addition, CIB1 has a coiled-coil domain and a C-terminal domain.

== Function ==
CIB1 is involved in regulating cell adhesion, migration, and differentiation, as well as other cellular processes. It interacts with integrins, which are transmembrane receptors that play a key role in cell signaling and adhesion to the extracellular matrix. CIB1 has also been shown to regulate other signaling pathways that are important for cell survival and proliferation.

== Clinical significance ==
=== Cancer ===
Upregulation of CIB1 expression has been observed in several types of cancer, and it has been implicated in cancer development and progression. CIB1 is involved in several cellular processes that are important for cancer progression, including cell adhesion, migration, and invasion. It has been shown to interact with integrins, which are transmembrane receptors that play a key role in these processes. The structure and function of CIB1 make it an important protein in regulating various cellular processes, including those involved in cancer progression, and targeting it may offer potential therapeutic benefits.

CIB1 expression has been observed in several types of cancer, including breast, lung, prostate, ovarian, and pancreatic cancer. In breast cancer, CIB1 expression has been shown to be higher in invasive ductal carcinoma compared to normal breast tissue. High levels of CIB1 expression have also been associated with poor prognosis in breast cancer patients. CIB1 has been implicated in cancer development and progression. In breast cancer, CIB1 has been shown to promote cell proliferation, migration, invasion, and metastasis. CIB1 has also been shown to promote the growth of prostate cancer cells and the invasion of ovarian cancer cells. Targeting CIB1 has been explored as a potential therapeutic strategy for cancer. Small molecule inhibitors of CIB1 have shown promise in preclinical models of breast cancer. Silencing CIB1 expression has also been shown to sensitize cancer cells to chemotherapy and radiation therapy.

=== Male infertility ===
CIB1 has been implicated in male fertility, specifically in sperm function and motility. CIB1 expression has been detected in human sperm, and its levels have been correlated with sperm motility. CIB1 has also been shown to be present in the acrosome region of the sperm, which plays a critical role in fertilization. Studies in mice have shown that CIB1 deficiency leads to impaired sperm motility and reduced fertility. Male mice lacking CIB1 exhibited decreased sperm count and decreased sperm motility, resulting in reduced fertility. CIB1 was also found to be required for the proper formation of the sperm tail, which is critical for sperm motility. In addition, CIB1 has been shown to regulate calcium signaling in sperm, which is important for sperm motility and fertilization. CIB1 interacts with the sperm-specific calcium channel CatSper, which is important for regulating intracellular calcium levels in sperm.

=== Spermatogenesis ===
Spermatogenesis is the process of producing mature spermatozoa from spermatogonia, the precursor cells in the testes. This process involves several stages, including mitotic division, meiotic division, and differentiation, which results in the production of four haploid sperm cells from one diploid spermatogonium. CIB1 has been shown to play a critical role in spermatogenesis by regulating the differentiation of spermatogonia into spermatocytes. Studies have shown that CIB1 is expressed in spermatogonia, spermatocytes, and spermatids, indicating its role throughout the entire process of spermatogenesis. In mice, CIB1 deficiency has been shown to lead to decreased spermatogonia proliferation and impaired differentiation into spermatocytes, resulting in reduced sperm production and male infertility. In addition, CIB1 has been shown to regulate the expression of genes involved in spermatogenesis, including genes involved in cell proliferation and differentiation.

== Interactions ==
CIB1 has been shown to interact with RAC3, PSEN2, DNA-PKcs, UBR5 and CD61.
