= UBR5 =

Protein-coding gene in humans

Identifiers
- Aliases: UBR5, DD5, EDD, EDD1, HYD, ubiquitin protein ligase E3 component n-recognin 5
- External IDs: OMIM: 608413; MGI: 1918040; GeneCards: UBR5
Available structures
PDB	Ortholog search: PDBe RCSB
PDB	List of PDB id codes 1I2T, 2QHO, 3PT3
Enzyme activity
EC #	BRENDA	ExPASy	KEGG	MetaCyc
2.3.2.26	↗	↗	↗	↗

Gene location (Human)
Chr.	Chromosome 8 (human)
Band	8q22.3	Start	102,252,273 bp
Band	8q22.3	End	102,412,759 bp

Gene location (Mouse)
Chr.	Chromosome 15 (mouse)
Band	15|15 B3.1	Start	37,967,572 bp
Band	15|15 B3.1	End	38,079,098 bp
RNA expression pattern
Bgee	Human / Mouse (ortholog); Top expressed in: ventricular zone; sural nerve; ganglionic eminence; epithelium of colon; Achilles tendon; left testis; gastric mucosa; right testis; skin of abdomen; skin of leg / Top expressed in: genital tubercle; tail of embryo; saccule; spermatocyte; neural layer of retina; otic placode; spermatid; otic vesicle; cumulus cell; ventricular zone; More reference expression data
BioGPS	n/a
Gene ontology
Molecular function	ubiquitin-protein transferase activity; ubiquitin-ubiquitin ligase activity; ubiquitin binding; protein binding; RNA binding; zinc ion binding; metal ion binding; transferase activity; ubiquitin protein ligase activity
Cellular component	nucleus; nucleoplasm; membrane; cytosol; perinuclear region of cytoplasm; protein-containing complex
Biological process	negative regulation of double-strand break repair; negative regulation of histone H2A K63-linked ubiquitination; protein polyubiquitination; progesterone receptor signaling pathway; cellular response to DNA damage stimulus; ubiquitin-dependent protein catabolic process; positive regulation of canonical Wnt signaling pathway; protein ubiquitination; cell population proliferation; DNA repair; positive regulation of gene expression; viral process; protein K48-linked ubiquitination; positive regulation of protein import into nucleus
Sources:Amigo / QuickGO
Orthologs
Databases	NCBI: entry; OMA: entry
Species	Human	Mouse
Entrez	51366	70790
Ensembl	ENSG00000104517	ENSMUSG00000037487
UniProt	O95071	Q80TP3
RefSeq (mRNA)	NM_001282873; NM_015902	NM_001081359; NM_001112721; NM_027553
RefSeq (protein)	NP_001269802; NP_056986	NP_001074828; NP_001106192
Location (UCSC)	Chr 8: 102.25 – 102.41 Mb	Chr 15: 37.97 – 38.08 Mb
PubMed search
- Wikidata
View/Edit Human	View/Edit Mouse

E3 ubiquitin-protein ligase UBR5 is an enzyme that in humans is encoded by the UBR5 gene.

== Function ==
This gene encodes a progestin-induced protein, which belongs to the HECT (homology to E6-AP carboxyl terminus) family. The HECT family proteins function as E3 ubiquitin-protein ligases, targeting specific proteins for ubiquitin-mediated proteolysis. This gene is localized to chromosome 8q22 which is disrupted in a variety of cancers. This gene potentially has a role in regulation of cell proliferation or differentiation.

Mutations in UBR5 have been associated with autism spectrum disorder.

== Interactions ==
UBR5 has been shown to interact with:

- CIB1,
- Karyopherin alpha 1,
- MAPK1, and
- TOPBP1.
