= UBE3C =

Protein-coding gene in the species Homo sapiens

Identifiers
- Aliases: UBE3C, HECTH2, ubiquitin protein ligase E3C, RAUL
- External IDs: OMIM: 614454; MGI: 2140998; GeneCards: UBE3C
Enzyme activity
EC #	BRENDA	ExPASy	KEGG	MetaCyc
2.3.2.26	↗	↗	↗	↗

Gene location (Human)
Chr.	Chromosome 7 (human)
Band	7q36.3	Start	157,138,916 bp
Band	7q36.3	End	157,269,370 bp

Gene location (Mouse)
Chr.	Chromosome 5 (mouse)
Band	5|5 B1	Start	29,774,240 bp
Band	5|5 B1	End	29,881,090 bp
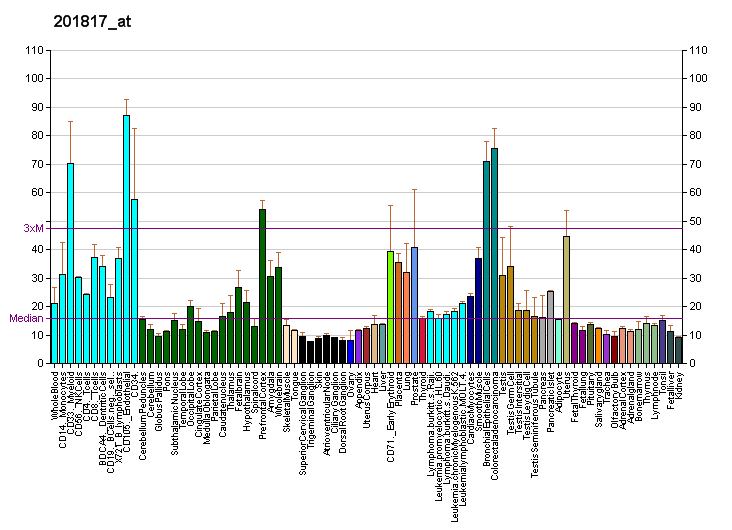
RNA expression pattern
Bgee	Human / Mouse (ortholog); Top expressed in: sural nerve; Achilles tendon; islet of Langerhans; epithelium of colon; gastrocnemius muscle; muscle of thigh; stromal cell of endometrium; gingival epithelium; Skeletal muscle tissue of biceps brachii; rectum / Top expressed in: spermatocyte; muscle of thigh; spermatid; dentate gyrus of hippocampal formation granule cell; tail of embryo; facial motor nucleus; triceps brachii muscle; cumulus cell; trigeminal ganglion; primary visual cortex; More reference expression data
BioGPS	More reference expression data
Gene ontology
Molecular function	protein binding; ubiquitin-protein transferase activity; transferase activity; ubiquitin protein ligase activity; ubiquitin conjugating enzyme activity
Cellular component	proteasome complex; intracellular anatomical structure; nucleus; cytoplasm
Biological process	protein polyubiquitination; protein ubiquitination; ubiquitin-dependent protein catabolic process
Sources:Amigo / QuickGO
Orthologs
Databases	NCBI: entry; OMA: entry
Species	Human	Mouse
Entrez	9690	100763
Ensembl	ENSG00000009335	ENSMUSG00000039000
UniProt	Q15386	Q80U95
RefSeq (mRNA)	NM_014671	NM_133907
RefSeq (protein)	NP_055486	NP_598668
Location (UCSC)	Chr 7: 157.14 – 157.27 Mb	Chr 5: 29.77 – 29.88 Mb
PubMed search
- Wikidata
View/Edit Human	View/Edit Mouse

Ubiquitin-protein ligase E3C is an enzyme that in humans is encoded by the UBE3C gene.
