= TRIP12 =

Gene of the species Homo sapiens

Identifiers
- Aliases: TRIP12, TRIP-12, ULF, thyroid hormone receptor interactor 12
- External IDs: OMIM: 604506; MGI: 1309481; GeneCards: TRIP12
Enzyme activity
EC #	BRENDA	ExPASy	KEGG	MetaCyc
2.3.2.26	↗	↗	↗	↗

Gene location (Mouse)
Chr.	Chromosome 1 (mouse)
Band	1|1 C5	Start	84,721,189 bp
Band	1|1 C5	End	84,840,516 bp
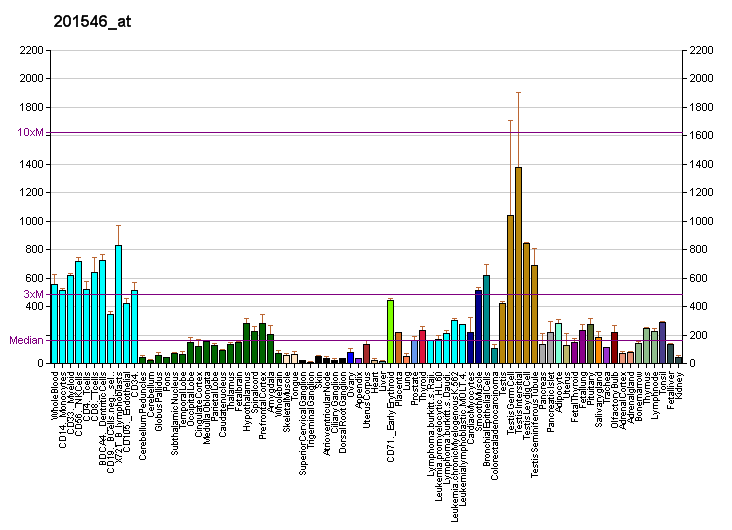
RNA expression pattern
Bgee	Human / Mouse (ortholog); n/a / Top expressed in: spermatid; spermatocyte; seminiferous tubule; Gonadal ridge; primitive streak; medullary collecting duct; hair follicle; conjunctival fornix; primary oocyte; urothelium
BioGPS	More reference expression data
Gene ontology
Molecular function	thyroid hormone receptor binding; protein binding; ubiquitin-protein transferase activity; transferase activity; ubiquitin protein ligase activity
Cellular component	nucleus; nucleoplasm; cytosol; nuclear speck; cytoplasm
Biological process	negative regulation of double-strand break repair; negative regulation of histone H2A K63-linked ubiquitination; DNA repair; protein ubiquitination; embryo development; cellular response to DNA damage stimulus; protein polyubiquitination; ubiquitin-dependent protein catabolic process; regulation of embryonic development
Sources:Amigo / QuickGO
Orthologs
Databases	NCBI: entry; OMA: entry
Species	Human	Mouse
Entrez	9320	14897
Ensembl	ENSG00000153827	ENSMUSG00000026219
UniProt	Q14669	G5E870
RefSeq (mRNA)	NM_001284214; NM_001284215; NM_001284216; NM_004238	NM_133975
RefSeq (protein)	NP_001271143; NP_001271144; NP_001271145; NP_004229; NP_001335244 NP_001335245; NP_001335246; NP_001335247; NP_001335248; NP_001335249; NP_001335250; NP_001335251; NP_001335252; NP_001335253; NP_001335254; NP_001335255; NP_001335256; NP_001335257; NP_001335258; NP_001335259; NP_001335260; NP_001335261; NP_001335262; NP_001335263; NP_001335264; NP_001335265	NP_598736
Location (UCSC)	n/a	Chr 1: 84.72 – 84.84 Mb
PubMed search
- Wikidata
View/Edit Human	View/Edit Mouse

Probable E3 ubiquitin-protein ligase TRIP12 is an enzyme that in humans is encoded by the TRIP12 gene.

== Interactions ==
TRIP12 has been shown to interact with APPBP1.
