= HECT domain =

HECT-domain (ubiquitin-transferase)
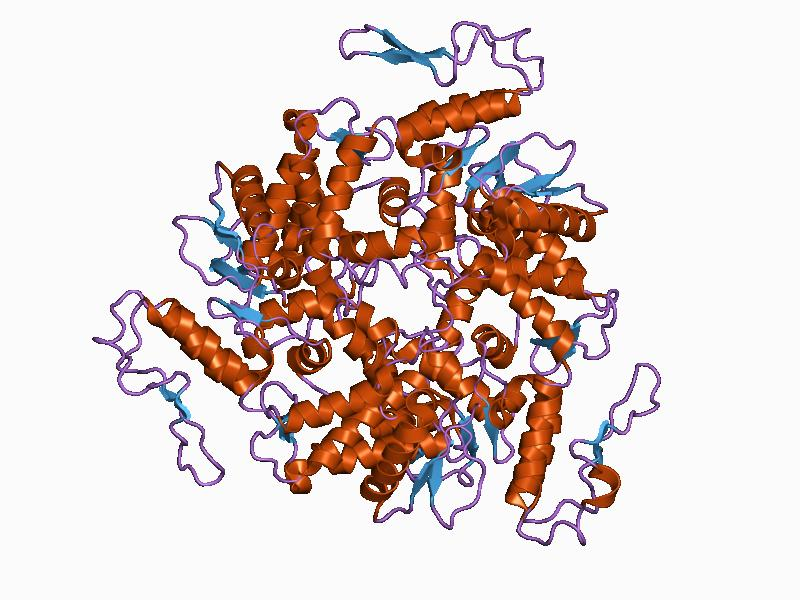
- structure of an e6ap-ubch7 complex: insights into the ubiquitination pathway

Identifiers
- Symbol: HECT
- Pfam: PF00632
- InterPro: IPR000569
- SCOP2: 1d5f / SCOPe / SUPFAM
Available protein structures:
- PDB: IPR000569 PF00632 (ECOD; PDBsum)
- AlphaFold: IPR000569; PF00632

In molecular biology, the HECT domain is a protein domain found in ubiquitin-protein ligases. The name HECT comes from 'Homologous to the E6-AP Carboxyl Terminus'. Proteins containing this domain at the C terminus include ubiquitin-protein ligase, which regulates ubiquitination of CDC25. Ubiquitin-protein ligase accepts ubiquitin from an E2 ubiquitin-conjugating enzyme in the form of a thioester, and then directly transfers the ubiquitin to targeted substrates. A cysteine residue is required for ubiquitin-thioester formation. Human thyroid receptor interacting protein 12 (TRIP12), which also contains this domain, is a component of an ATP-dependent multisubunit protein that interacts with the ligand binding domain of the thyroid hormone receptor. It could be an E3 ubiquitin-protein ligase. Human E6AP ubiquitin-protein ligase interacts with the E6 protein of the cancer-associated Human papillomavirus type 16 and Human papillomavirus type 18. The E6/E6-AP complex binds to and targets the p53 tumour-suppressor protein for ubiquitin-mediated proteolysis.
