= Human fertilization =

Union of a human egg and sperm

- Sperm about to enter the egg cell with acrosomal head ready to penetrate the zona pellucida and fertilize the egg

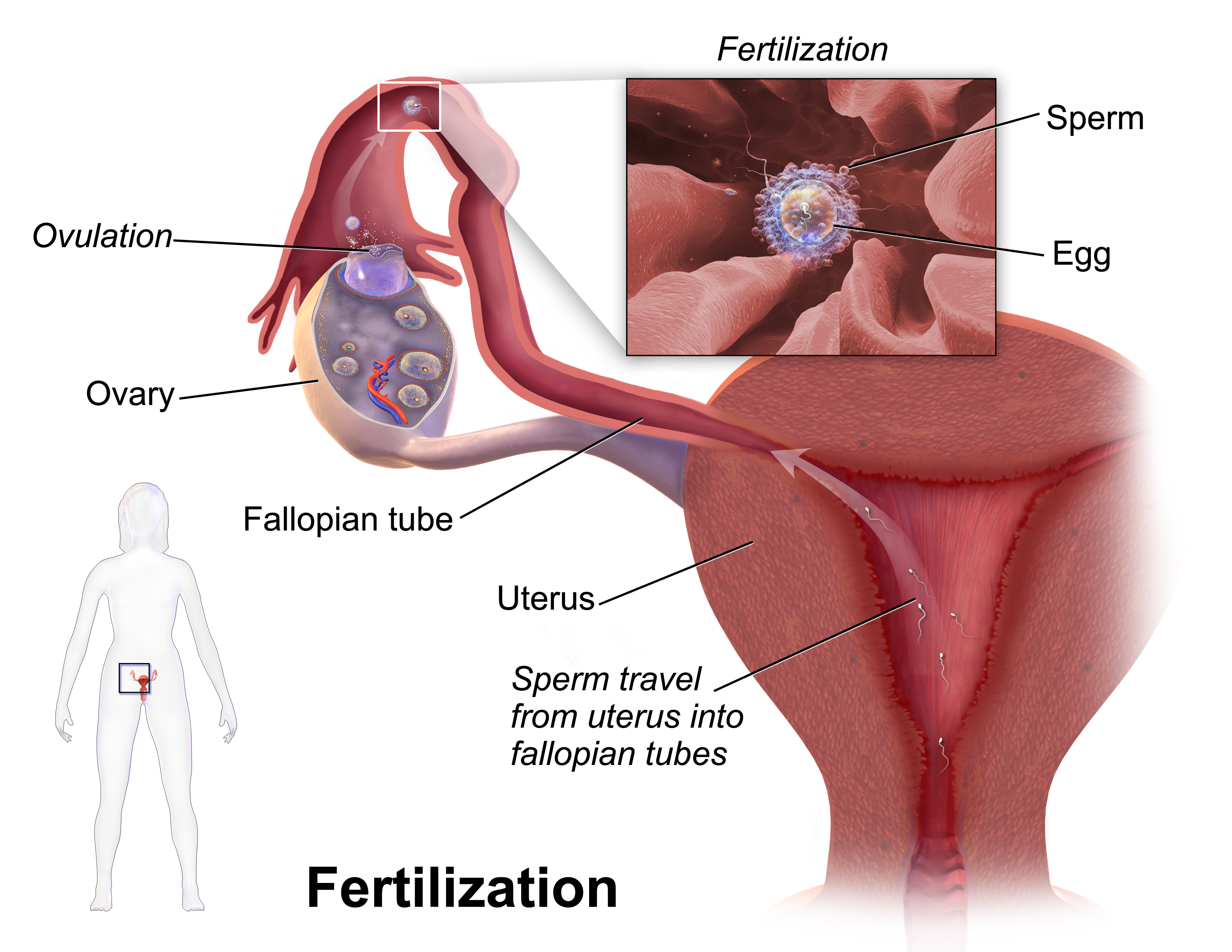
- Illustration depicting ovulation and fertilization

Details
- Days: 0
- Precursor: Gametes
- Gives rise to: Zygote

Human fertilization is the union of an egg cell and a sperm, occurring primarily in the ampulla of the fallopian tube. The result of this union leads to the production of a fertilized egg called a zygote, initiating embryonic development. Scientists discovered the dynamics of human fertilization in the 19th century.

The process of fertilization involves a sperm fusing with an egg cell also known as an ovum. The most common sequence begins with ejaculation during copulation, follows with ovulation, and finishes with fertilization. Various exceptions to this sequence are possible, including artificial insemination, in vitro fertilization, external ejaculation without copulation, or copulation shortly after ovulation. Upon encountering the secondary oocyte, the acrosome of the sperm produces enzymes which allow it to burrow through the outer shell called the zona pellucida of the egg. The sperm plasma then fuses with the egg's plasma membrane and their nuclei fuse, triggering the sperm head to disconnect from its flagellum as the egg travels down the fallopian tube to reach the uterus.

In vitro fertilization (IVF) is a process by which egg cells are fertilized by sperm outside the womb, in vitro.

== History ==
Fertilization was not understood in antiquity. Hippocrates believed that the embryo was the product of male semen and a female factor. Aristotle held that only male semen gave rise to an embryo, while the female only provided a place for the embryo to develop, a concept he acquired from the preformationist Pythagoras. Aristotle argued for form and function emerging gradually, in a mode called by him as epigenetic. In 1651, William Harvey refuted Aristotle's idea that menstrual blood could be involved in the formation of a fetus, asserting that eggs from the female were somehow caused to become a fetus as a result of sexual intercourse.

Sperm cells were discovered in 1677 by Antonie van Leeuwenhoek, who believed that Aristotle had been proven correct. Some observers believed they could see an entirely pre-formed little human body in the head of a sperm. The human ovum was first observed in 1827 by Karl Ernst von Baer. Only in 1876 did Oscar Hertwig prove that fertilization is due to fusion of an egg and sperm cell.

A common metaphor used to describe human fertilization is that of sperm racing to meet an egg. Another commonly used metaphor is that of two halves making a whole.

== Sperm and oocyte meet ==
=== Ampulla ===
Fertilization occurs in the ampulla of the fallopian tube, the section that curves around the ovary. Capacitated sperm, which swim at 1 to 3 mm/min (0.04 to 0.12 in/min) are attracted to progesterone, which is secreted from the cumulus cells surrounding the oocyte. Progesterone binds to the CatSper receptor on the sperm membrane and increases intracellular calcium levels, causing hyperactive motility. The sperm will continue to swim towards higher concentrations of progesterone, effectively guiding it to the oocyte. Around 200 out of 200 million spermatozoa reach the ampulla.

=== Sperm preparation ===
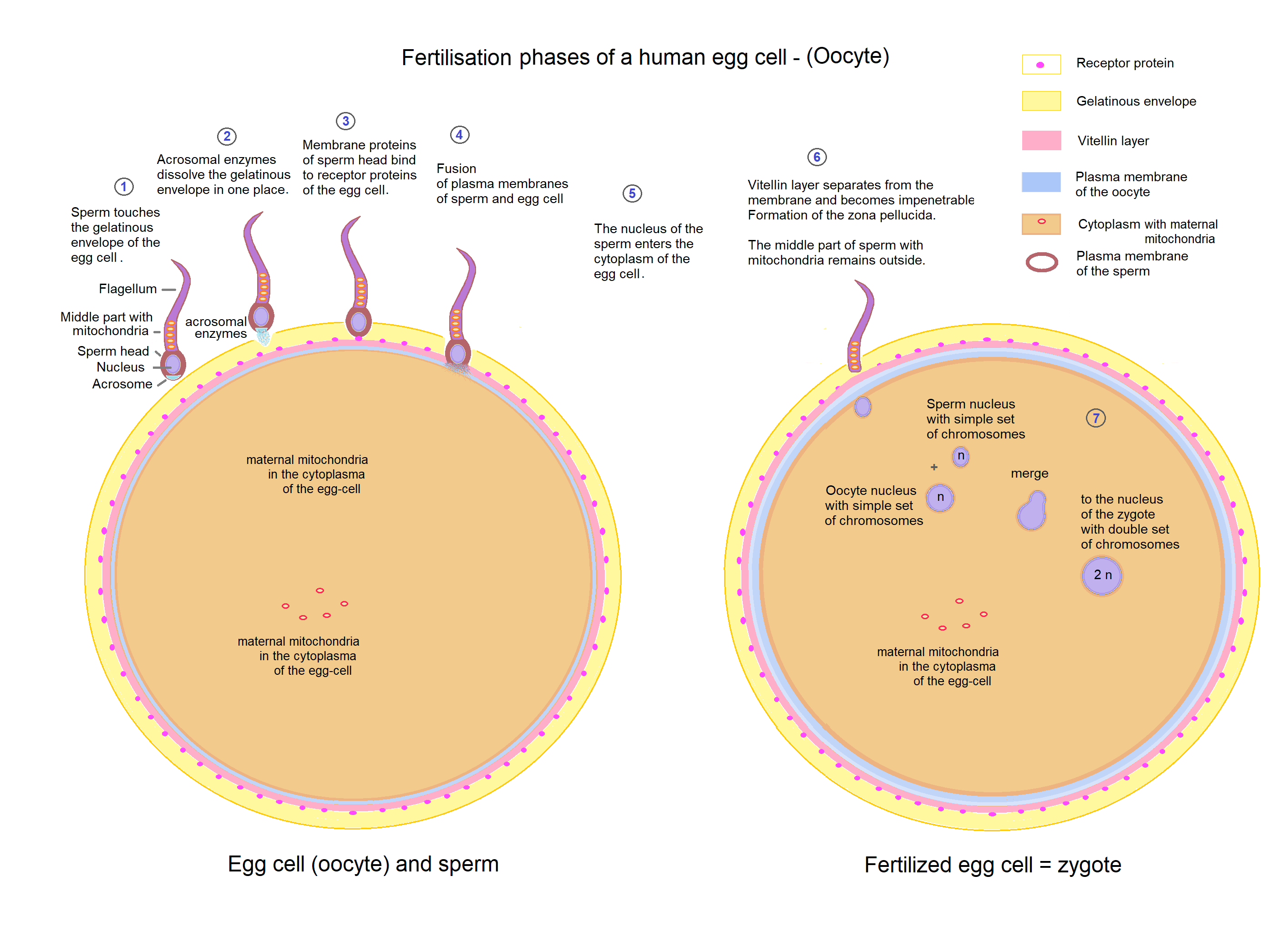
The sperm entering the ovum using acrosomal enzymes to dissolve the gelatinous envelope (zona pellucida) of the oocyte

At the beginning of the process, the sperm undergoes a series of changes, as freshly ejaculated sperm is unable or poorly able to fertilize. The sperm must undergo capacitation in the female's reproductive tract, which increases its motility and hyperpolarizes its membrane, preparing it for the acrosome reaction, the enzymatic penetration of the egg's tough membrane, the zona pellucida, which surrounds the oocyte.

=== Corona radiata ===
The sperm binds through the corona radiata, a layer of follicle cells on the outside of the secondary oocyte. The corona radiata sends out chemicals that attract the sperm in the fallopian tube to the oocyte. It lies above the zona pellucida, a membrane of glycoproteins that surrounds the oocyte.

=== Cone of attraction and perivitelline membrane ===
Where the spermatozoon is about to pierce, the yolk (ooplasm) is drawn out into a conical elevation, termed the cone of attraction or reception cone. Once the spermatozoon has entered, the peripheral portion of the yolk changes into a membrane, the perivitelline membrane, which prevents the passage of additional spermatozoa.

=== Zona pellucida and acrosome reaction ===
After binding to the corona radiata the sperm reaches the zona pellucida, which is an extracellular matrix of glycoproteins. A ZP3 glycoprotein on the zona pellucida binds to a receptor on the cell surface of the sperm head. This binding triggers the acrosome to burst, releasing acrosomal enzymes that help the sperm penetrate through the thick zona pellucida layer surrounding the oocyte, ultimately gaining access to the egg's cell membrane.

Some sperm cells consume their acrosome prematurely on the surface of the egg cell, facilitating the penetration by other sperm cells. As a population, mature haploid sperm cells have on average 50% genome similarity, so the premature acrosomal reactions aid fertilization by a member of the same cohort. It may be regarded as a mechanism of kin selection.

Studies have shown that the egg is not passive during this process. In other words, they too appear to undergo changes that help facilitate such interaction.

== Fusion ==
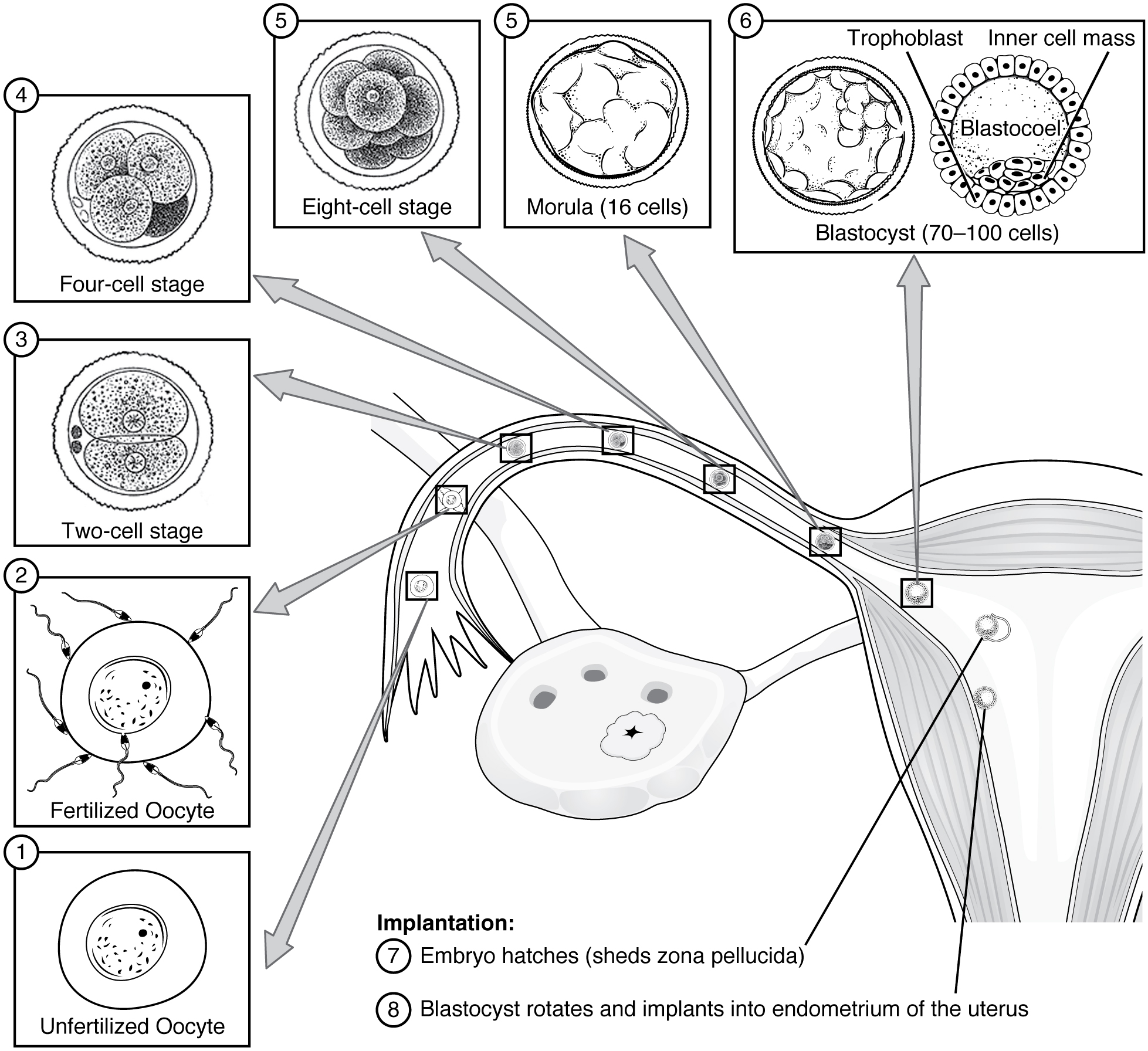
Fertilization and implantation in humans

=== Cortical reaction ===
After the sperm enters the cytoplasm of the oocyte, the tail and the outer coating of the sperm disintegrate. The fusion of sperm and oocyte membranes causes cortical reaction to occur. Cortical granules inside the secondary oocyte fuse with the plasma membrane of the cell, causing enzymes inside these granules to be expelled by exocytosis to the zona pellucida. This in turn causes the glycoproteins in the zona pellucida to cross-link with each other — i.e. the enzymes cause the ZP2 to hydrolyse into ZP2f — making the whole matrix hard and impermeable to sperm. This prevents fertilization of an egg by more than one sperm.

=== Fusion of genetic material ===
==== Preparation ====
In preparation for the fusion of their genetic material both the oocyte and the sperm undergo transformations as a reaction to the fusion of cell membranes.

The oocyte completes its second meiotic division. This results in a mature haploid ovum and the release of a polar body. The nucleus of the oocyte is called a pronucleus in this process, to distinguish it from the nuclei that are the result of fertilization.

Drawing of an ovum

The sperm's tail and mitochondria degenerate with the formation of the male pronucleus. This is why all mitochondria in humans are of maternal origin. Still, a considerable amount of RNA from the sperm is delivered to the resulting embryo and likely influences embryo development and the phenotype of the offspring.

==== Fusion ====
The sperm nucleus then fuses with the ovum, enabling fusion of their genetic material.

==== Blocks of polyspermy ====
When the sperm enters the perivitelline space, a sperm-specific protein Izumo on the head binds to Juno receptors on the oocyte membrane. Once it is bound, two blocks to polyspermy then occur. After approximately 40 minutes, the remaining Juno receptors on the oocyte are lost from the membrane, rendering it non-fusogenic. Additionally, the cortical reaction will happen which is caused by ovastacin binding and cleaving ZP2 receptors on the zona pellucida. These two blocks of polyspermy are what prevent the zygote from having too much DNA.

=== Replication ===
The pronuclei migrate toward the center of the oocyte, rapidly replicating their DNA as they do so to prepare the zygote for its first mitotic division.

=== Mitosis ===
Usually 23 chromosomes from spermatozoon and 23 chromosomes from egg cell fuse (approximately half of spermatozoons carry X chromosome and the other half Y chromosome). Their membranes dissolve, leaving no barriers between the male and female chromosomes. During this dissolution, a mitotic spindle forms between them. The spindle captures the chromosomes before they disperse in the egg cytoplasm. Upon subsequently undergoing mitosis (which includes pulling of chromatids towards centrioles in anaphase) the cell gathers genetic material from the male and female together. Thus, the first mitosis of the union of sperm and oocyte is the actual fusion of their chromosomes.

Each of the two daughter cells resulting from that mitosis has one replica of each chromatid that was replicated in the previous stage. Thus, they are genetically identical.

== Fertilization age ==
Comparison of dating systems for a typical pregnancy
Event	Gestational age (from the start of the last menstrual period)	Fertilization age	Implantation age
Menstrual period begins	Day 1 of pregnancy	Not pregnant	Not pregnant
Has sex and ovulates	2 weeks pregnant	Not pregnant	Not pregnant
Fertilization; cleavage stage begins	Day 15	Day 1	Not pregnant
Implantation of blastocyst begins	Day 20	Day 6	Day 0
Implantation finished	Day 26	Day 12	Day 6 (or Day 0)
Embryo stage begins; first missed period	4 weeks	Day 15	Day 9
Primitive heart function can be detected	5 weeks, 5 days	Day 26	Day 20
Fetal stage begins	10 weeks, 1 day	8 weeks, 1 day	7 weeks, 2 days
First trimester ends	13 weeks	11 weeks	10 weeks
Second trimester ends	26 weeks	24 weeks	23 weeks
Childbirth	39–40 weeks	37–38 weeks	36–37 weeks

Fertilization is the event most commonly used to mark the beginning point of life, in descriptions of prenatal development of the embryo or fetus. The resultant age is known as fertilization age, conceptional age, embryonic age, fetal age or (intrauterine) developmental (IUD) age.

Gestational age, in contrast, takes the beginning of the last menstrual period (LMP) as the start point. By convention, gestational age is calculated by adding 14 days to fertilization age and vice versa. Fertilization though usually occurs within a day of ovulation, which, in turn, occurs on average 14.6 days after the beginning of the preceding menstruation (LMP). There is also considerable variability in this interval, with a 95% prediction interval of the ovulation of 9 to 20 days after menstruation even for an average woman who has a mean LMP-to-ovulation time of 14.6. In a reference group representing all women, the 95% prediction interval of the LMP-to-ovulation is 8.2 to 20.5 days.

The average time to birth has been estimated to be 268 days (38 weeks and two days) from ovulation, with a standard deviation of 10 days or coefficient of variation of 3.7%.

Fertilization age is sometimes used postnatally (after birth) as well to estimate various risk factors. For example, it is a better predictor than postnatal age for risk of intraventricular hemorrhage in premature babies treated with extracorporeal membrane oxygenation.

== Diseases affecting human fertility ==
Various disorders can arise from defects in the fertilization process. Whether that results in the process of contact between the sperm and egg, or the state of health of the biological parent carrying the zygote cell. The following are a few of the diseases that can occur and be present during the process.

- Polyspermy results from multiple sperm fertilizing an egg, leading to an offset number of chromosomes within the embryo. Polyspermy, while physiologically possible in some species of vertebrates and invertebrates, is a lethal condition for the human zygote.
- Polyendocrine metabolic ovarian syndrome (PMOS) is a condition in which the woman does not produce enough follicle stimulating hormone and excessively produces androgens. This results in the ovulation period between contact of the egg being postponed or excluded.
- Autoimmune disorders can lead to complications in implantation of the egg in the uterus, which may be the immune system's attack response to an established embryo on the uterine wall.
- Cancer ultimately affects fertility and may lead to birth defects or miscarriages. Cancer severely damages reproductive organs, which affects fertility.
- Endocrine system disorders affect human fertility by decreasing the body's ability to produce the level of hormones needed to successfully carry a zygote. Examples of these disorders include diabetes, adrenal disorders, and thyroid disorders.
- Endometriosis is a condition that affects women in which the tissue normally produced in the uterus proceeds to grow outside of the uterus. This leads to extreme amounts of pain and discomfort and may result in an irregular menstrual cycle.
- Teratogenesis is a condition in which the woman pregnant with a developing offspring has defects form in the embryo or fetus they are carrying. This can inhibit the growth of the offspring physiologically, physically, and cause a degeneration in the overall wellbeing of the offspring later in life. It can be caused by the intake of substances harmful to the offspring.

== See also ==
- Development of the human body
- Spontaneous conception, the unassisted conception of a subsequent child after prior use of assisted reproductive technology
