= Oocyte activation =

Processes in fertilization

Oocyte (or ovum/egg) activation is a series of processes that occur in the oocyte during fertilization.

Sperm entry causes calcium release into the oocyte. In mammals, this is caused by the introduction of phospholipase C isoform zeta (PLCζ) from the sperm cytoplasm. Activation of the ovum includes the following events:

- Cortical reaction to block against other sperm cells
- Activation of egg metabolism
- Reactivation of meiosis
- DNA synthesis

== Sperm trigger of egg activation ==
The sperm may trigger egg activation via the interaction between a sperm protein and an egg surface receptor. Izumo is the sperm cell signal, that will trigger the egg receptor Juno. This receptor is activated by the sperm binding and a possible signaling pathway could be the activation of a tyrosine kinase which then activates phospholipase C (PLC). The inositol signaling system has been implicated as the pathway involved with egg activation. IP_{3} and DAG are produced from the cleavage of PIP_{2} by phospholipase C. However, another hypothesis is that a soluble 'sperm factor' diffuses from the sperm into the egg cytosol upon sperm-oocyte fusion. The results of this interaction could activate a signal transduction pathway that uses second messengers. A novel PLC isoform, PLCζ (PLCZ1), may be the equivalent of the mammalian sperm factor. A 2002 study demonstrated that mammalian sperm contain PLC zeta which can start the signaling cascade.

== Fast and slow block to polyspermy ==
Polyspermy is the condition when multiple sperm fuse with a single egg. This results in duplications of genetic material. In sea urchins, the block to polyspermy comes from two mechanisms: the fast block and the slow block. The fast block is an electrical block to polyspermy. The resting potential of an egg is -70mV. After contact with sperm, an influx of sodium ions increases the potential up to +20mV. The slow block is through a biochemical mechanism triggered by a wave of calcium increase. The rise of calcium is both necessary and sufficient to trigger the slow block. In the cortical reaction, cortical granules directly beneath the plasma membrane are released into the space between the plasma membrane and the vitelline membrane (the perivitelline space). An increase in calcium triggers this release. The contents of the granules contain proteases, mucopolysaccharides, hyalin, and peroxidases. The proteases cleave the bridges connecting the plasma membrane and the vitelline membrane and cleave the bindin to release the sperm. The mucopolysaccharides attract water to raise the vitelline membrane. The hyalin forms a layer adjacent to the plasma membrane and the peroxidases cross-link the protein in the vitelline membrane to harden it and make it impenetrable to sperm. Through these molecules the vitelline membrane is transformed into the fertilization membrane or fertilization envelope. In mice, the zona reaction is the equivalent to the cortical reaction in sea urchins. The terminal sugars from ZP3 are cleaved to release the sperm and prevent new binding.

== Reactivation of meiosis ==
The meiotic cycle of the oocyte was suspended in metaphase of the second meiotic division. Once PLCζ is introduced into the oocyte by the sperm cell, it cleaves phospholipid phosphatidylinositol 4,5-bisphosphate (PIP_{2}) into diacyl glycerol (DAG) and inositol 1,4,5-trisphosphate (IP_{3}). In most cells, this occurs at the cell membrane however, evidence suggests that the PIP_{2} required for oocyte activation is potentially stored in intracellular vesicles dispersed throughout the cytoplasm. The IP_{3} produced then triggers calcium oscillations which reactivate the meiotic cycle. This results in the production and extrusion of the second polar body.

== DNA synthesis ==
4 hours after fusion of sperm and ovum, DNA synthesis begins. Male and female pronuclei move to the centre of the egg and membranes break down. Male protamines are replaced with histones and the male DNA is demethylated. Chromosomes then orientate on the metaphase spindle for mitosis. This combination of the two genomes is called syngamy.

The sperm contributes a pronucleus and a centriole to the egg. Most other components and organelles are rapidly degraded. Mitochondria are rapidly ubiquitinated and destroyed. Oxidative stress theory is a hypothesis that it is evolutionarily favourable for mitochondria from the father to be destroyed, as it there is a greater possibility that the mitochondrial DNA has become mutated or damaged. This is because mtDNA is not protected by histones and has poor repair mechanisms. Due to the increased metabolic activity of the sperm compared to the egg, due to its motility, there is greater production of reactive oxygen species and therefore greater chance of mutation. Furthermore, sperm are exposed to reactive oxygen species from leukocytes in the epididymis during transit. Additionally, quality control of spermatozoa is much worse than for the ovum, as many sperm are released whereas only one dominant follicle is released per cycle. This competitive selection helps to ensure the most 'fit' ova are selected for fertilisation.

== Artificial oocyte activation ==
Oocyte activation may be artificially facilitated by calcium ionophores, something that is speculated to be useful in case of fertilization failure, such as still occurs in 1–5% of intracytoplasmic sperm injection (ICSI) cycles. Another of method is by using the drug Roscovitine, this reduces the activity of M-phase promoting factor activity in mice.

Indications for artificial oocyte activation include:

- Oocyte related activation deficiency
- In vitro maturation
- Low number of oocytes at retrieval
- Severe teratozoospermia
- Severe oligoasthenoteratozoospermia
- Globozoospermia
- Testicular sperm extraction (MicroTESE)
- Previous fertilization failure
- Unexplained infertility
- Frozen-thawed oocytes
