= Internal fertilization =

Union of an egg and sperm to form a zygote within the female body

Internal fertilization is the union of an egg and sperm cell during sexual reproduction inside the female body. Internal fertilization, unlike its counterpart, external fertilization, brings more control to the female with reproduction. Most taxa that reproduce by internal fertilization are gonochoric.

Male animals inseminate females in order to internally fertilize their egg cells. Most reptiles and certain other vertebrates transfer sperm through a male intromittent organ into the female cloaca during copulation. Mammals ejaculate sperm and seminal fluid through the male penis into the female vagina. Most birds use the "cloacal kiss," pressing cloacas together to transfer sperm. Salamanders, spiders, some insects and some molluscs undertake internal fertilization by transferring a spermatophore, a bundle of sperm, from the male to the female. After fertilization, embryos develop in eggs in oviparous species or inside the mother’s reproductive tract in viviparous ones.

== Evolution of internal fertilization ==
Internal fertilization evolved many times in animals. According to David B. Dusenbery all the features with internal fertilization were most likely a result from oogamy. It has been argued that internal fertilization evolve because of sexual selection through sperm competition.

In amphibians, internal fertilization evolved from external fertilization.

== Methods of internal fertilization ==
Fertilization which takes place inside the female body is called internal fertilization in animals is done through the following different ways:

- Copulation, which involves the insertion of the penis or other intromittent organ into the vagina (in most mammals) or to the cloaca in monotremes, most reptiles, some birds, the tailed frog, some fish, the disappeared dinosaurs, as well as in other non-vertebrate animals.
- Cloacal kiss, which consists in that the two animals touch their cloacae together in order to transfer the sperm of the male to the female. It is used in most birds and in the tuatara, that do not have an intromittent organ.
- Via spermatophore, a sperm-containing cap placed by the male in the female's cloaca. Usually, the sperm is stored in spermathecae on the roof of the cloaca until it is needed at the time of oviposition. It is used by some salamander and newt species, by the Arachnida, some insects and some mollusks.
- In sponges, sperm cells are released into the water to fertilize ova that are retained by the female. Some species of sponge participate in external fertilization where the ova is released.

== Processes unique to internal fertilization ==
Internal fertilization involves different processes than external fertilization. Some of these unique processes include the following: sperm capacitation, building reservoirs of sperm/ sperm pockets within the oviduct, sperm migration within the oviduct, acrosomal reactions, and sperm competition.

Sperm capacitation has been studied primarily in mammals such as humans, rodents, and bovines. This is an especially important process for internal fertilization because it ensures that sperm are activated at the right time and place to promote the greatest success with fertilization.

The prevention of polyspermy is also an important process of internal fertilization. Internal fertilization utilizes a slow block, or cortical reaction, that uses different mechanisms and components than the mechanisms and components used during external fertilization. While external fertilization also utilizes a fast block system, little is known about a fast block response associated with species that fertilize internally.

== Expulsion ==
At some point, the growing egg or offspring must be expelled. There are several possible modes of reproduction. These are traditionally classified as follows:

- Oviparity, as in most invertebrates and reptiles, monotremes, dinosaurs and all birds which lay eggs that continue to develop after being laid, and hatch later.
- Viviparity, as in almost all mammals (such as whales, kangaroos and humans) which bear their young live. The developing young spend proportionately more time within the female's reproductive tract. The young are later released to survive on their own, with varying amounts of help from the parent(s) of the species.
- Ovoviviparity, as in the garter snake, most vipers, and the Madagascar hissing cockroach, which have eggs (with shells) that hatch as they are laid, making it resemble live birth.

== Advantages to internal fertilization ==
Internal fertilization allows for:

- Female mate choice, which gives the female the ability to choose her partner before and after mating. The female cannot do this with external fertilization because she may have limited control of who is fertilizing her eggs, and when they are being fertilized.
- Making a decision for the conditions of reproduction, like location and time. In external fertilization a female can only choose the time in which she releases her eggs, but not when they are fertilized. This is similar, in ways, to cryptic female choice.
- Egg protection on dry land. While oviparous animals either have a jelly like ovum or a hard shell enclosing their egg, internally fertilizing animals grow their eggs and offspring inside themselves. This offers protection from predators and from dehydration on land. This allows for a higher chance of survival when there is a regulated temperature and protected area within the mother.

== Disadvantages to internal fertilization ==
- Gestation can and will add additional risks for the mother. The additional risks from gestation come from extra energy demands.
- Along with internal fertilization comes sexual reproduction, in most cases. Sexual reproduction comes with some risks as well. The risks with sexual reproduction are with intercourse, it is infrequent and only works well during peak fertility. While animals which externally fertilize are able to release egg and sperm, usually into the water, not needing a specific partner to reproduce.
- Fewer offspring are produced through internal fertilization in comparison to external fertilization. This is both because the mother cannot hold and grow as many offspring as eggs, and the mother cannot provide and obtain enough resources for a larger amount of offspring.

== Fish ==
Some species of fish, such as guppies, have the ability to internally fertilize. This process involves the male guppy inserting a tubular fin into the female's reproductive opening, and then it will deposit sperm into the female guppy's reproductive tract. Internal fertilization in cartilaginous fishes contains the same evolutionary origin as reptiles, birds, and mammals that internally fertilize. Additionally, there is no noticeable difference in tonality for species of fish that fertilize internally.

== Amphibians ==
Most amphibians utilize external fertilization, however, there are some exceptions, such as the salamander. Salamanders mainly utilize internal fertilization. Salamanders do not copulate because the male salamander does not have an external penis. Rather, the male salamander produces an encased capsule of sperm and nutrients called a spermatophore. The male deposits a spermatophore on the ground, and the female will pick it up with her cloaca (a combined urinary and genital opening) and fertilize her eggs with it. Because the female is not expelling the eggs to be fertilized, this is a form of internal fertilization.

Over time, an increasing number of amphibians have been discovered transitioning to a more internalist mode of fertilization. This transition is likely an effect of the transition from water to land during vertebrate evolution. There is an advantage for the amphibians who utilize internal fertilization because it allows for a greater selection of a time and place for reproduction.

== Birds ==
Most birds do not have penises but achieve internal fertilization via cloacal contact (or "cloaca kiss"). In these birds, males and females contact their cloacas together, typically briefly, and transfer sperm to the female. However, water fowls such as ducks and geese have penises and are able to use them for internal fertilization. While birds have internal fertilization, most species no longer have phallus structures. This makes them the only vertebrate taxon to fall into both categories of lacking the phallus but participating in internal fertilization.

== Mammals ==
Mammals are ideal model organisms for studying internal fertilization because all species within the mammalian class reproduce via internal fertilization processes. Mammals copulate as their method of reproduction. Internal fertilization for all mammals involves recognition events of the sperm and oocyte, acrosome reactions and associations, piercings of the oocyte zona pellucida by sperm, and reactions such as the cortical and zona reactions. Sperm capacitation is a process more common in mammalian species than any other internally fertilizing species, due to the complex female reproductive system, requiring the sperm to travel farther and have a more significant signal recognition with the egg.

== See also ==
- Fertilization
