= DF =

DF or df may refer to:

== Gaming ==
- DeFRaG, a modification for the computer game Quake III Arena
- DragonFable, a 2006 video game by Artix Entertainment
- Dwarf Fortress, a 2006 sandbox-style computer game

== Places ==
- Distrito Federal (Brazil), or the Federal District
- Distrito Federal (Mexico), or the Federal District, now known as Mexico City

== Politics ==
- Danish People's Party (Dansk Folkeparti)
- Democratic Front (Bosnia and Herzegovina) (Demokratska fronta)
- Democratic Front (Montenegro) (Demokratski front)

== Science and technology ==
- df (Unix), a Unix command to report disk space usage by a filesystem
- Dairy free, identifying products that contain no milk
- Decapacitation factor, in biochemistry
- Degrees of freedom, various measures in statistics, mathematics and physics
- Density function, a mathematical function with a wide range of applications
- Dielectric loss
- Direction finding, a technique used to locate radio transmitters
- Direction flag, a flag stored in the FLAGS register on all x86-compatible CPUs
- Dissipation factor, a measure of loss-rate of energy of an oscillation mode in a dissipative system
- Dongfeng (missile), a Chinese intercontinental ballistic missile
- Dongfeng series of diesel locomotives
  - China Railways DF
  - China Railways DF4
  - China Railways DF8
- Methylphosphonyl difluoride, a chemical weapons precursor
- Daylight factor (DF), the ratio of the light level inside a structure to the light level outside the structure.
- Deuterium fluoride, a form of hydrogen fluoride using deuterium atoms

== Other uses ==
- Defender (association football)
- Delta Force, a component of the U.S. Army Joint Special Operations Command
- Design Factory, a department of Aalto University
- Duty Free, goods which are free from tax or duty
- New Zealand DF class locomotive (1979)
- Quantum Air (formerly AeBal), Spanish airline (IATA code DF)

== See also ==
- Dongfeng (disambiguation)
- Distrito Federal (disambiguation)
