= Vitelline envelope =

Outer proteinaceous layer outside the oocyte and egg

The insect vitelline envelope is the outer proteinaceous layer outside the oocyte and egg. The vitelline envelope, not being a cellular structure, is commonly referred to as a membrane. However, this is a technical misnomer as the structure is composed of protein and is not a cellular component. It varies in thickness between different insects and even varies at different parts of the egg. It lies inside the outer shell of the egg, which is commonly referred to as the chorion.

The presence of the vitelline membrane defines the embryo's boundaries. It is a critical structural element required to resist the forces of morphogenesis and the mechanical pressures experienced during egg-laying.

Before egg activation, the vitelline membrane is permeable to water, ions, and small molecules. Egg activation is stimulated by mechanical deformation associated with traversing through the narrow channel in the oviduct and requires the presence of Ca2+. During egg activation, the vitelline membrane proteins are crosslinked via disulfide remodeling; the structure rigidifies and becomes impermeable to water but remains gas permeable. This process is hypothesized to have been selected to prevent polyspermy. The vitelline membrane is composed primarily of four glycoproteins, collectively referred to as vitelline membrane proteins (VMPs). This class of proteins contains a conserved "VM domain": (CX7CX8C). VMPs are secreted during stages 9–10 of oogenesis and accumulate as vitelline bodies in the extracellular space; these bodies fuse to form a continuous layer at the end of stage 10. This layer thins as the oocyte grows to reach a final thickness of ~0.4 um.

Upon egg activation, peroxidase-mediated crosslinking occurs in the vitelline membrane resulting in a disulfide-linked network. After crosslinking, the envelope is impermeable to additional sperm, water, and other large molecules but remains permeable to gas exchange. Spatial information and developmental patterning are encoded on the surface of the vitelline membrane. For example, in D. melanogaster, the dorsal-ventral body axis is determined by ventrally sulfated eggshell proteins that recruit and activate the Spätzle ligand within the perivitelline space, which, in turn, activates the Toll receptor upstream of morphogens such as Dorsal and Twist.
