= Egg jelly =

Egg jelly (extracellular layer, jelly coat) is a gelatinous layer that surrounds the oocytes of many organisms and releases species-specific chemoattractants that activate and guide sperm to the oocyte. The release of chemoattractants is species dependent. For example, sperm in Lytechinus variegatus, the green sea urchin, are not chemotactically attracted to the jelly or the egg. The egg jelly is located immediately surrounding the vitelline envelope and consists primarily of a network of short peptides and sulfated fucan glycoproteins. These short peptides diffuse into the surrounding area and stimulate respiration and movement of the sperm to the egg. An example of such a peptide is resact, which has been studied as the primary means of attracting and orientating sperm to the eggs in sea urchins. The sulfated fucan glycoproteins play an important role in binding to sperm receptors and triggering the acrosomal reaction.

Many other functions for the egg jelly have been proposed including sperm agglomeration, protection from mechanical stress and polyspermy, and increasing the size of the egg to improve its chances of colliding with sperm. For echinoderms the jelly coat can increase the diameter of the egg by more than 100%, making it efficient in enhancing fertilization. In female P. shqipericus, the Albanian water frog, the jelly coat cause sperm to become motile and move faster. For this species of frog, the sperm must interact with the jelly coat for the egg to be successfully fertilized.

Unlike the egg cell, jelly coats do not provide the embryo nutrients. In addition to the sea urchin, egg jelly appears in many species including invertebrates and mammals. Egg jelly can vary in composition and complexity from the relatively homogenous single layer sea urchin egg to the three layer egg jelly in starfish.

There is an increasing concern in how ocean acidification will affect the fertilization of eggs. In H. tuberculate, low pH can damage the eggs chemical influence on sperm mobility and velocity.

== See also ==
- Sperm guidance
- Acrosome reaction
- Oocyte
