= Vitelline membrane outer layer protein I (VMO-I) =

VOMI
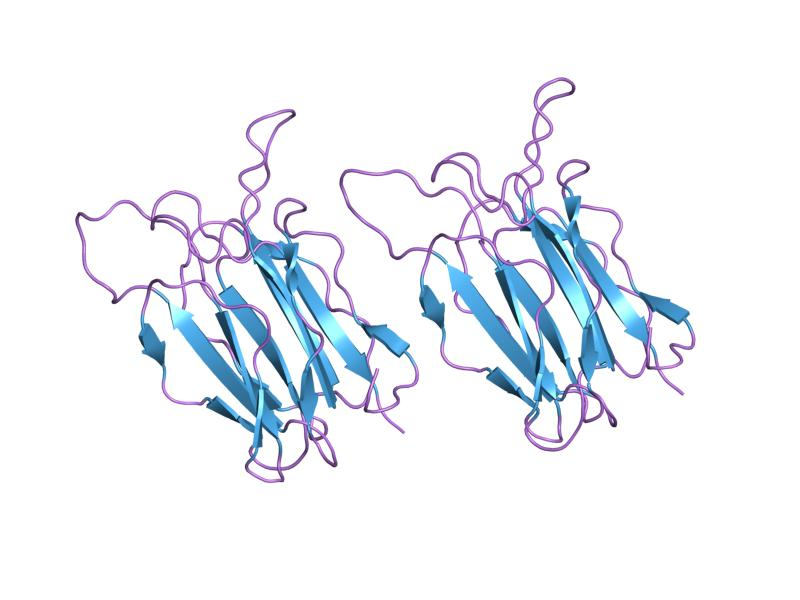
- crystal structure of vitelline membrane outer layer protein i (vmo-i): a folding motif with homologous greek key structures related by an internal three-fold symmetry

Identifiers
- Symbol: VOMI
- Pfam: PF03762
- InterPro: IPR005515
- SCOP2: 1vmo / SCOPe / SUPFAM
Available protein structures:
- PDB: IPR005515 PF03762 (ECOD; PDBsum)
- AlphaFold: IPR005515; PF03762

Vitelline membrane outer layer protein I (VMO-I) is a protein domain found on the outside of an egg, in the vitelline membrane.

== Function ==
The major role of the vitelline membrane is to prevent the mixing of the yolk and albumen and also act as an important anti-microbial barrier, as indicated by the high content of lysozyme in the outer layer Vitelline membrane outer layer protein I (VMO-I) binds tightly to ovomucin fibrils, which construct the backbone of the outer layer membrane. VMO-I has considerable activity to synthesize N-acetylchito-oligosaccharide from N-acetylglucosamine hexasaccharides but no hydrolysis activity. VMO-I is composed of 163 aa

== Structure ==
The structure consists of three beta-sheets forming Greek key motifs, which are related by an internal pseudo three-fold symmetry. Furthermore, the structure of VOMI has strong similarity to the structure of the delta-endotoxin, as well as a carbohydrate-binding site in the top region of the common fold. VMO-I revealed a unique structure of the P-prism fold, a new type of multi-sheet assembly.
