= Vitelline membrane =

Structure surrounding the surface of the plasma membrane of an ovum

Details

Identifiers
- Latin: membrana vitellina
- MeSH: D014817

The vitelline membrane or vitelline envelope is a structure surrounding the outer surface of the plasma membrane of an ovum (the oolemma) or, in some animals (e.g., birds), the extracellular yolk and the oolemma. It is composed mostly of protein fibers, with protein receptors needed for sperm binding which, in turn, are bound to sperm plasma membrane receptors. The species-specificity between these receptors contributes to prevention of breeding between different species. It is called zona pellucida in mammals. Between the vitelline membrane and the oolemma (ovum cell membrane) is a fluid-filled perivitelline space.

As soon as the spermatozoon fuses with the ovum, signal transduction occurs, resulting in an increase of cytoplasmic calcium ions. This itself triggers the cortical reaction, which results in depositing several substances onto the vitelline membrane through exocytosis of the cortical granules, transforming it into a hard layer called the "fertilization membrane", which serves as a barrier inaccessible to other spermatozoa. This phenomenon is the slow block to polyspermy.

In insects, the vitelline membrane is called the vitelline envelope and is the inner lining of the chorion.

== Structure and function ==
=== Birds ===
The vitelline membrane of the hen is made of two main protein layers that provide support for the yolk and separation from the albumen. The inner layer is known as the perivitelline lamina. It is a single layer that measures roughly 1 μm to 3.5 μm thick and is mainly composed of five glycoproteins that have been discovered to resemble glycoproteins of the zona pellucida in mammals involved in maintaining structure (ZP domain proteins). The outer layer, known as the extravitelline lamina, has multiple sublayers which results in thickness that ranges from 0.3 μm to 9 μm. It is primarily composed of proteins, such as lysozyme, ovomucin and vitelline outer membrane proteins that are responsible for constructing the network of dense, thin protein fibres that establish the foundation for further growth of the outer layer during embryonic development. Taking a wider view, ZP domain proteins are found in the vitelline membrane of chordates (which contains the vertebrates) in general.

The vitelline membrane is known to function as a barrier that allows for diffusion of water and selective nutrients between the albumen and the yolk.

=== Teleost fish ===
Teleost fish have no acrosome on their sperm cells. Their eggs coats have a small opening that lets a single sperm through.

=== Molluscs ===
Although molluscs are not closely related to chordates, they too have ZP domain proteins in the vitelline envelope. Those recognize sperm lysin.

=== Insects ===
Insect egg coat is made of structural proteins, but these proteins are not related to the ZP proteins.

== Formation ==
In the adult hen, liver cells express the proteins required for initial formation of the inner layer. These proteins travel via the blood from the liver to the site of assembly in the ovary. Before ovulation occurs, the inner layer forms from follicular cells that surround the oocyte. After ovulation, fertilization of the egg proceeds with the formation of the outer layer that is secreted by infundibulum glands located along the first parts of the oviduct.

== Sperm recognition and fertilization ==
After the sperm digests its way through the jelly layer, the acrosomal process of the sperm makes contact with the vitelline envelope. The vitelline envelope has glycoproteins and peptides that allow for species-specific sperm binding and recognition. For example, in the sea urchin species, red sea urchin and purple sea urchin, the vitelline membrane has bindin receptors for the bindin protein present on the sperm head. In the African clawed frog, it was found that the gp69/gp64 glycoprotein pair is involved in sperm recognition and binding.

== Infections and diseases ==
The vitelline membrane serves a different purpose in chickens. In the chicken egg, the yolk is separated from the albumen by the vitelline membrane which acts as a barrier to microbial infection. Apart from the 13 proteins identified to make up the membrane, the proteins that are key to providing antimicrobial properties to the membrane are the vitelline outer membrane proteins (VMO) 1 and 2. A recent study reports that VMO 1 can be a potential diagnostic marker for ovarian cancer in hens due to its ability to regulate estrogen and target microRNAs in the chickens' oviduct. Another difference is that the vitelline membrane has two major layers: the inner layer that faces the yolk, intermediary and external outer layer that contacts the albumen.

== Other animals ==
In sea urchins, the formation of the vitelline membrane comes directly after fertilization and later thickens to form the fertilization membrane. This process is completed in about a minute. The innermost membrane of all animal eggs except some cnidarians is called the vitelline membrane. Some invertebrates and some lower chordate eggs are covered by this membrane only, while most have other membranes. Frog and bird eggs have a very thin vitelline membrane which are surrounded by either a jelly layer (frogs) or other membranes (birds). In mammals, the structure is called the zona pellucida and is surrounded by a layer of support cells, called the corona radiata.

== Additional images ==
Vitelline membrane in a bird egg (7)

Vitelline membrane in an amphibian egg (2)

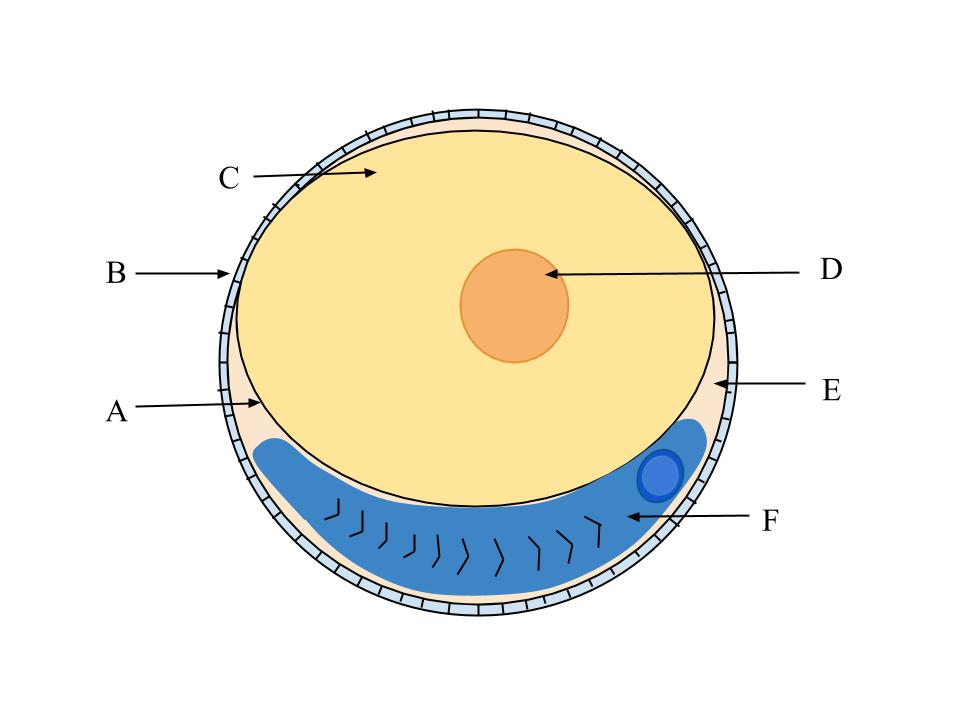
Vitelline membrane in a fish egg (A)

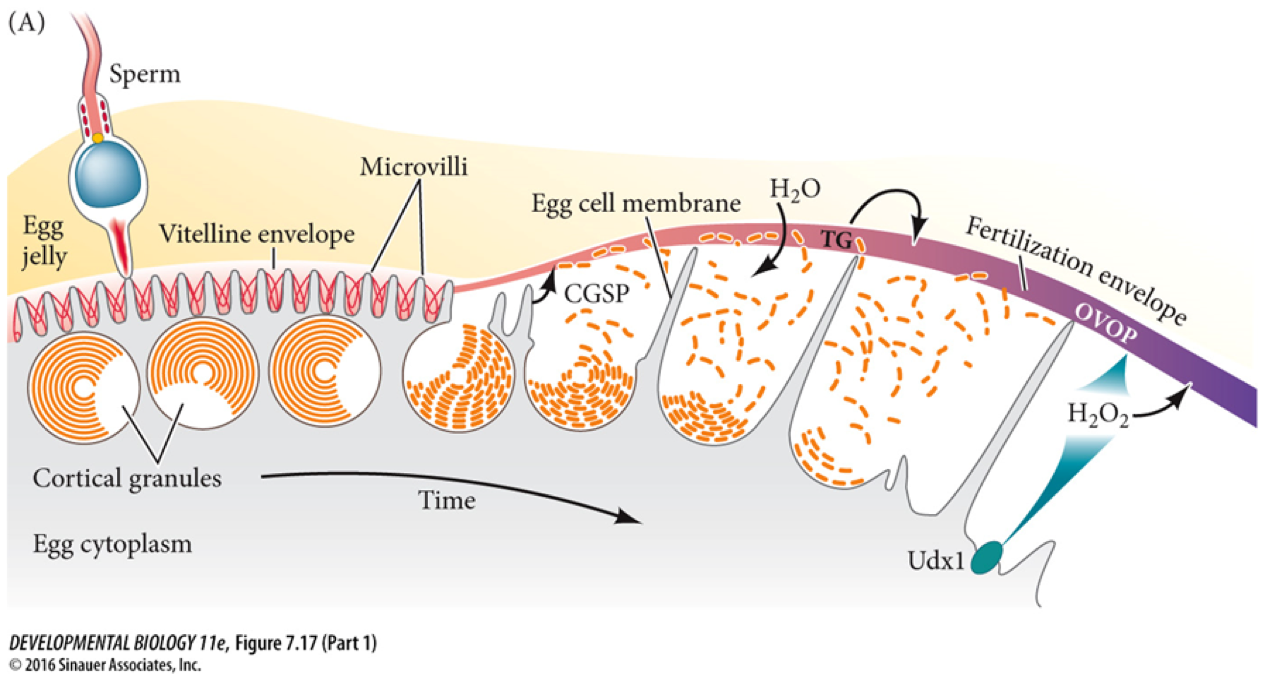
Formation of Fertilization envelope from the Vitelline envelope

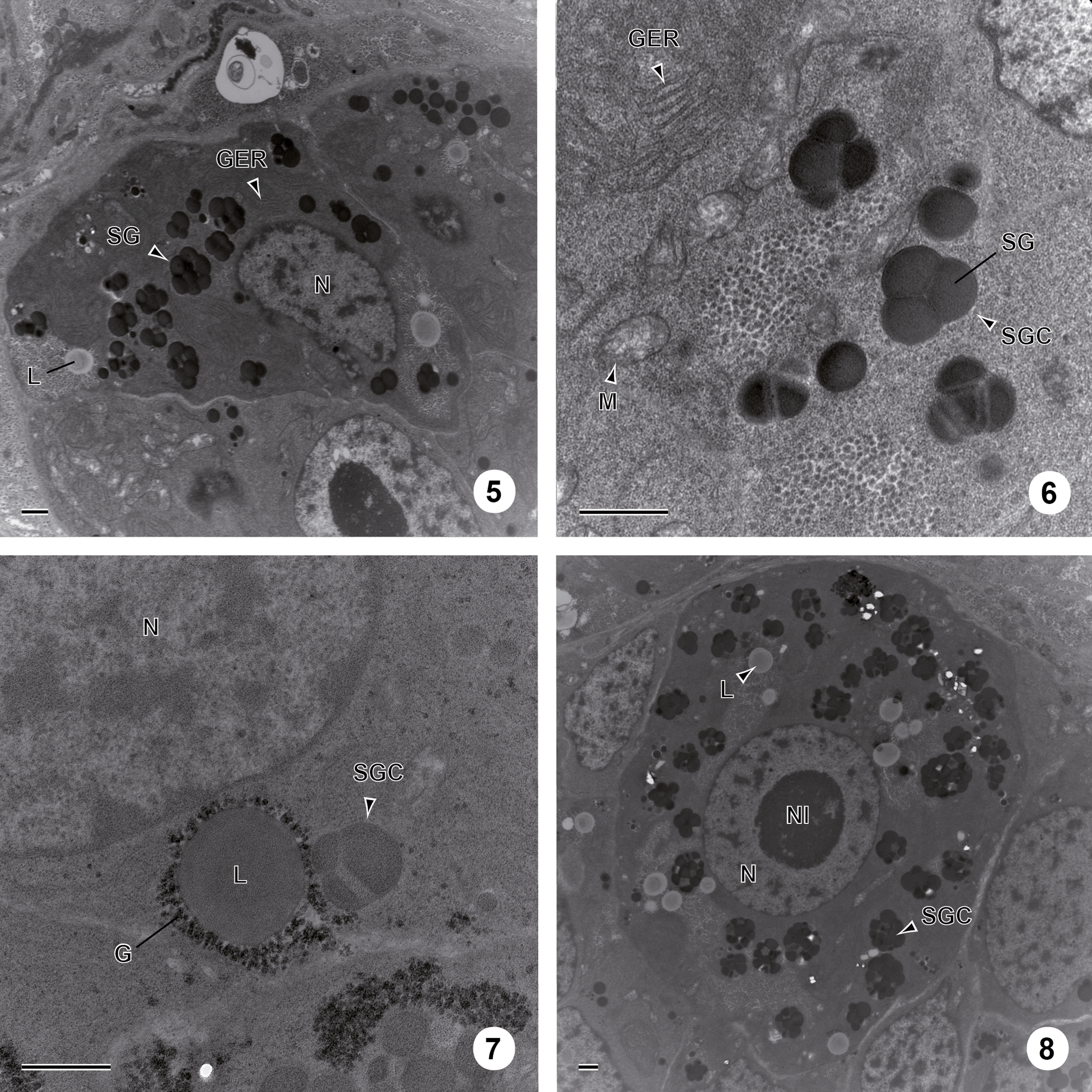
Parasitism and the Vitelline Membrane

== See also ==
- Cortical reaction
- Egg activation
- Perivitelline space
- Zona pellucida
