= Capacitation =

Penultimate step in the activation of mammalian spermatozoa

Capacitation is a process sperm must undergo to prepare to fertilize an egg. This is a process that mature spermatozoa undergo after entering the oviduct and uterus of the female reproductive tract. Sperm must undergo capacitation and the acrosome reaction to be able to penetrate through the outer layers of an oocyte, namely the cumulus ooporus and the zona pellucida. Capacitation results in hyperactivation of sperm motility, with the acrosome and cortical reaction following this. Compounds such as heparin and progesterone can be used to induce capacitation.

As a result of the sperm entering the upper female reproductive tract, the sperm are introduced to an extracellular environment that contains a cholesterol acceptor (usually serum albumin), electrolytes, and energy substrates such as glucose, pyruvate, and lactate. It is this change in environment that triggers capacitation. For purposes of in vitro fertilization, capacitation occurs by incubating spermatozoa that have been retrieved via ejaculation or extracted from the epididymis and incubated in a defined medium for several hours. There are different techniques to perform the capacitation step: simple washing, migration (swim-up), density gradients, and filter.

== Species-dependent characteristics ==
Capacitation occurs in mammalian species, but the duration of capacitation differs between species. Studies have reported that sperm capacitation in humans takes between 3-10 hours. Despite the anatomical and physiological differences between species, the use of animal models has contributed significantly to our understanding of capacitation. Non-mammalian spermatozoa do not require activation as they are ready to fertilize an oocyte immediately after release from the male.

== Function and mechanism ==
Sperm capacitation consists of five main steps: changes to the sperm plasma membrane that cause increased membrane fluidity, pH changes, ion flux, activation of secondary pathways, and changes to membrane potential (hyperpolarization). These steps result in hyperactivation of sperm motility.

=== Step 1: Cholesterol efflux and membrane lipid reorganization ===
During capacitation, the sperm plasma membrane becomes more fluid. This occurs by the movement of cholesterol out of the sperm membrane. Albumin, which exists in high concentrations in the oviduct, removes cholesterol from the sperm plasma membrane. Following ejaculation, lipocalin-2 (LCN2) works alongside other cholesterol acceptors, such as albumin and LTP-1, to stimulate cholesterol efflux.

Release of glycosylphosphatidylinositol-anchor proteins (GPI-APs), which are membrane proteins present in lipid rafts, occurs as a result of cholesterol efflux. The release of GPI-APs destabilizes the ordered lipid domains, promoting membrane fluidity and the loss of decapacitation factors. Decapacitation factors are glycoproteins or glycolipids that stabilize the membrane and prevent premature capacitation. The removal of cholesterol, anchoring proteins, and decapacitation factors allows capacitation progression.

=== Step 2: Intracellular alkalinization ===
Activation of intracellular signaling pathways involved in capacitation are dependent on cellular pH of sperm. Sperm alkalinization (increasing the pH within the sperm) is mediated by the influx of bicarbonate (HCO_{3}^{-}) into the sperm and efflux of protons (H^{+}) out of the sperm. If cholesterol is retained in the sperm membrane, however, the ion channels necessary to transport H^{+} and HCO_{3}^{-} are not activated and pH does not change.

Bicarbonate (HCO_{3}^{-}), which is present in high concentrations in the female reproductive tract, can be transported into sperm through solute carrier transporters (SLCs). Types of bicarbonate transporters involved in capacitation include: sodium bicarbonate cotransporters (NBCs) and channels from the SLC26 family. The efflux of protons is dependent on voltage-gated proton channels such as HVCN1 and Na^{+}/H^{+} exchangers (NHEs), which belong to the SLC9 protein family. Another key proton transporter is hHv1, which is thought to be the main proton transporter in humans. Through the action of H^{+} and HCO_{3}^{-} transporters, the intracellular pH of sperm increases from 6.94 to 7.08.

=== Step 3: Changes in ion flux ===
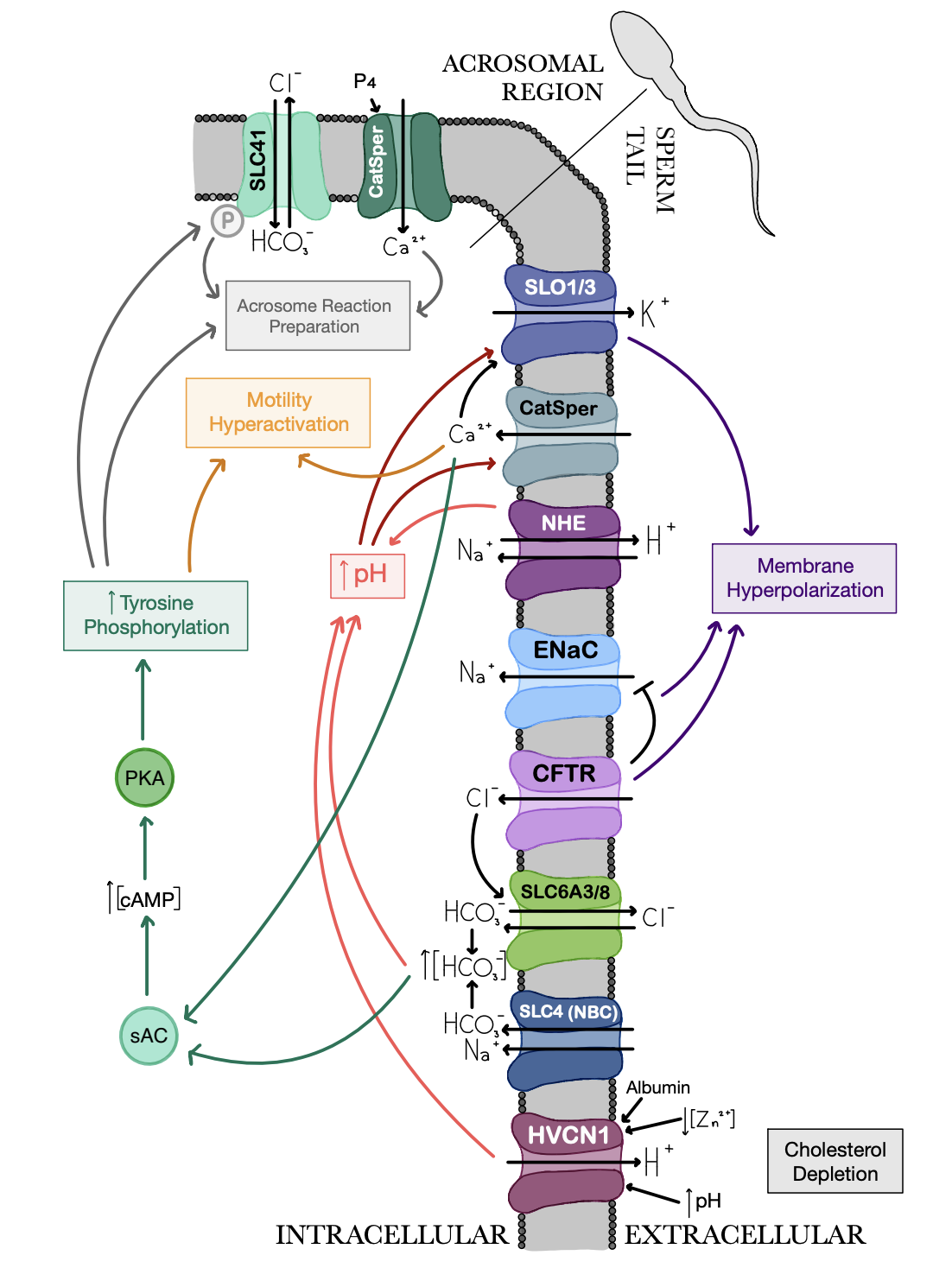
Main ion channels and signaling pathways involved in sperm capacitation

Intracellular sperm alkalinization triggers calcium influx through the sperm-specific pH sensitive voltage-gated Ca^{2+} channels (CatSpers). CatSpers move Ca^{2+} into the sperm. Other Ca^{2+} channels that contribute to the influx of Ca^{2+} include: Ca^{2+} ATPases, transient-receptor potential (TRP) channels, Na^{+}/Ca^{2+} exchangers (NCX), voltage-gated Ca^{2+} channels (Cav), and cyclic nucleotide-gated (CNG) channels. Intracellular Ca^{2+} is involved in secondary signaling pathways.

Sperm capacitation also requires the movement of other ions such as potassium, chloride, and sodium. These are necessary for inducing hyperpolarization, sustaining the Ca^{2+} influx, and triggering acrosomal exocytosis.

- Potassium is transported out of the sperm through the action of SLO3 (also referred to as KSper) and SLO5 channels. These channels are activated by the alkaline conditions in the oviduct.
- Chloride is transported into the sperm using CFTR channels.
- Sodium is transported by ENaC, which moves sodium out of the sperm. ENaC is activated by high pH and the presence of Ca^{2+}. SLC4 transporters (namely NBC cotransporters) and epithelial Na^{+} channels (ENaCs) are essential to downstream signaling pathways and for membrane potential regulation.

=== Step 4: cAMP/PKA activation and phosphorylation ===
As a result of the elevated HCO_{3}^{-} and Ca^{2+} levels in the oviduct, the enzyme solute adenylyl cyclase (sAC) levels increase. Increased levels of sAC result in increased cyclic adenosine monophosphate (cAMP) synthesis, activating a secondary pathway.

Protein kinase A (PKA), which is activated by cAMP, phosphorylates actin polymerization regulators and other target proteins. This signaling pathway contributes to zona pellucida binding and acrosome reaction preparation. Phosphorylation by PKA can also regulate upstream steps of capacitation such as membrane remodeling, cholesterol efflux, calcium flux, and pH changes.

=== Step 5: Hyperactivation of sperm motility ===
Hyperactivation of sperm motility is primarily induced through cellular hyperpolarization and Ca^{2+} influx through the action of CatSpers. Hyperactivation is characterized by asymmetric swimming and high-amplitude flagellular beating. This is the final component of capacitation.

== Induction ==
Because assisted reproductive technologies, or ARTs, such as in vitro fertilization (IVF) or intrauterine insemination (IUI) require the induction of sperm cell capacitation outside of normal biological parameters, numerous methods have been developed to induce this process in mammalian sperm cells. Sperm cells are harvested through ejaculation or harvested from the caudal epididymis and allowed to liquefy at room temperature. Capacitation can then be induced by adding media designed to mimic the electrolytic composition of the fallopian tubes, where fertilization occurs. These media vary between species, but are saline-based and contain energy substrates such as lactate, pyruvate, and possibly glucose. A cholesterol acceptor is required to facilitate the removal of cholesterol from the sperm cell membrane, which is often albumin. Bovine serum albumin is typically used for in vitro animal studies, and human serum albumin (HSA) is used in human sperm capacitation induction.

Bicarbonate is a vital component of capacitation-inducing media, as it is co-transported into the cytosol where it activates soluble adenylyl cyclase (sAC) as well as acts as a pH buffer necessary to prevent decreasing the pH in the culture, a necessary addition when incubating cells at 5% CO_{2} as is generally used although not required. Calcium chloride is added to facilitated the influx via of calcium cations. In animal models, Tyrode's albumin lactate pyruvate (TALP) medium is typically used as a base, which contains each of these components. In humans, human tubal fluid (HTF) is used.

These media can be supplemented with other chemicals to induce hyperactivated sperm motility and/or the acrosome reaction. For animal in vitro fertilization, caffeine at 5 mM concentration is a strong inducer of sperm capacitation in vitro. Calcium ionophores are also ideal to induce capacitation. Adding heparin to capacitation inducing medium mimics the secretion of heparin-like gycosaminoglycans (GAGs) near the oocyte and initiates the acrosome reaction. This effect is magnified when adding lysophosphatidylcholine (LC) in conjunction with heparin. Catecholamines such as norepinephrine at low concentrations have been shown to assist in acrosome reaction induction.

== In vitro capacitation techniques ==
The traditional methods to perform in vitro capacitation are:

- Simple wash: this method only eliminates seminal plasma, it does not select the best spermatozoa. The sample is centrifuged and then, the supernatant is eliminated. It is used in severe oligozoospermia, cryptozoospermia or testis biopsy samples. It is performed before other capacitation techniques too.
- Migration (swim-up). Firstly, centrifugation takes place and seminal plasma is eliminated. Then, 0.5 -1 ml of culture medium is added at the top and after the incubation period at 37°C, the best motile spermatozoa will have ascend from the bottom to the top of the tube (healthy spermatozoa go to the culture medium). In order to obtain the fraction rich in spermatozoa, the top layer is collected. It is still widely used and useful in normozoospermia. It allows to obtain fractions with more than 90% of PR spermatozoa.
- Density gradients. In this technique, a tube is filled with layers of liquids of different densities and semen is placed on the top layer. Then, The tube goes through a centrifugation to filter cell debris and non motile cells. After the centrifugation, healthy sperm are on the very bottom layer of the liquid in the tube, while debris and non-motile spermatozoa are in upper layers. This procedure takes approximately 60 minutes and it is specially indicated in oligozoospermia, asthenozoospermia and abundant debris samples. At the end, all the cells will arrive to the bottom, but those with more motility will arrive sooner. This procedure is often called just the "Percoll method", since Percoll was frequently used as the density medium, but other density mediums are now used.
- Filtration. It consist in a filter that does not allow every sperm to pass. It is less used nowadays and only spermatozoa with better motility will pass through the filter.

PICSI, MACS or microfluidic chips are more recent methods that can be used to induce capacitation in vitro.

== In vitro measurement methods ==
Numerous methods have been developed to assess the degree to which sperm cells are undergoing capacitation in vitro. Computer-aided sperm analysis (CASA) was developed in the 1980s for measuring sperm kinematics. CASA uses phase-contrast microscopy combined with sperm tracking software to analyze sperm motility parameters. Certain parameters such as curvilinear velocity (VCL), straightline velocity (VSL), average path velocity (VAP), and the amplitude of lateral head displacement (ALH) have been shown to be positively correlated with the acquisition of fertilization competency and are thus used to identify hyperactive sperm cell motility.

While motility measurements are critical for identifying the presence of hyperactive motility, additional methods have been developed to identify the occurrence of the acrosome reaction. A simple method uses Coomassie brilliant blue G250 to stain cells, providing visual evidence of intact or reacted acrosomes. More advanced techniques employ fluorescent or electron microscopy methods. Fluorescein-conjugated Peanut agglutinin (FITC-PNA) or Pisum sativum agglutinin (FITC-PSA) can be used to fluorescently tag the acrosome of sperm cells, which can be then used to assess the status of the acrosome using a fluorescent microscope.

== Discovery ==
The discovery of this process was independently reported in 1951 by both Min Chueh Chang and Colin Russell Austin.

== See also ==
- Cortical reaction
- Acrosome reaction
