= Decapacitation factor =

Decapacitation factor (DF) is composed of sperm surface-associated proteins which modulate the fertilizing ability of spermatozoa. Decapacitation is a reversible process that converts fertile, capacitated sperm to less-fertile uncapacitated sperm. This activity is achieved by interaction between cholesterol, phospholipids and fibronectin-like substances and delivered via small vesicles in seminal plasma. DF prevents onset of capacitation. Many DFs are released in secretions from the epididymis and accessory organs of the male reproductive system. However, some DFs have been identified that are located on the acrosome of sperm. Normally, capacitation is initiated through the loss of DF before the spermatozoa can perform the acrosomal reaction. Physiologically decapacitation will inhibit the acrosomal reaction as DFs reassociate onto the sperm surface. For example, one way this can be achieved is through spermatozoal membrane stabilization by maintaining physiological cholesterol/phospholipid ratio.

The study of DFs can help understand male infertility and has possible role in reversible male contraception. DFs are potent, but can be removed from sperm by gentle centrifugation to produce extremely fertile sperm. DFs have been found in bull, rabbit, boar, stallion, monkey, mouse, and human semen. Purification to obtain DFs and subsequent injection into a uterus with capacitated sperm decreases the efficiency of fertilization and converts sperm to an uncapacitated form. In natural conditions, the uterus has the ability to inactivate or remove DF, allowing capacitation to occur. In vitro incubation of DF with β-amylase was demonstrated to destroy DF activity, and Dukelow hypothesized that uterine amylase would similarly be able to destroy DF activity and allow capacitation to occur. In addition, the DF factors can be removed from the seminal plasma by gentle centrifugation to cause capacitation and can be added back to cause decapacitation.

Various DFs have been found and characterized. One DF was removed by gentle centrifugation from rabbit seminal plasma and is an anionic polypeptide with an MR ~40,000 and is heat stable, cannot be destroyed by proteases at pH 8, and is stable when incubated other enzymes like lysozyme and glucose oxidase. Some other DFs, such as DF10 and DF-R, have been reported as alternative forms of other proteins found in sperm. NYD-SP27 is a unique DF as it is intrinsic to the sperm acrosome and inhibits the action of phospholipase C that is necessary for capacitation. SERPINE2 is a proposed DF, as it is present in high concentrations on uncapacitated sperm and is lost during the capacitation process. Platelet-activating factor acetylhydrolase is another proposed DF due to the negative correlation between its concentration and the motility of sperm. Recently, the mechanisms of DFs such as SPINK3 had been demonstrated
