= Distrito Federal =

Distrito Federal (Portuguese and Spanish for "Federal district") may refer to:

- Distrito Federal (Brazil)
- Distrito Federal (Mexico)
- Distrito Federal (Argentina)
- Distrito Federal (Venezuela)
- Distrito Federal, 2021 album by Mexican music project Mexican Institute of Sound

== See also ==
- Capital districts and territories
- Distrito Capital
- Capital Federal
- Distrito Nacional
