= Sperm-egg fusion protein Juno =

Protein-coding gene in the species Homo sapiens

IZUMO1R

Identifiers
- Aliases: IZUMO1R, Folbp3, JUNO, FOLR4, Juno (protein), IZUMO1 receptor, JUNO, FR-delta
- External IDs: OMIM: 615737; MGI: 1929185; GeneCards: IZUMO1R
Available structures
PDB	Ortholog search: PDBe RCSB
PDB	List of PDB id codes 5JKD, 5F4Q, 5JKB, 5F4E, 5JKA, 5JKC, 5JKE

Gene location (Human)
Chr.	Chromosome 11 (human)
Band	11q21	Start	94,304,580 bp
Band	11q21	End	94,308,146 bp

Gene location (Mouse)
Chr.	Chromosome 9 (mouse)
Band	9|9 A2	Start	14,797,110 bp
Band	9|9 A2	End	14,815,245 bp
RNA expression pattern
Bgee	Human / Mouse (ortholog); Top expressed in: lymph node; ascending aorta; sural nerve; Achilles tendon; left coronary artery; right coronary artery; smooth muscle tissue; Descending thoracic aorta; appendix; rectum / Top expressed in: zygote; secondary oocyte; primary oocyte; mesenteric lymph nodes; thymus; morula; spleen; blood; vestibular membrane of cochlear duct; embryo; More reference expression data
BioGPS	n/a
Gene ontology
Molecular function	protein binding; folic acid binding; signaling receptor activity; signaling receptor binding
Cellular component	anchored component of membrane; membrane; extracellular region; plasma membrane; anchored component of external side of plasma membrane
Biological process	single fertilization; cell adhesion; fusion of sperm to egg plasma membrane involved in single fertilization; sperm-egg recognition; signal transduction
Sources:Amigo / QuickGO
Orthologs
Databases	NCBI: entry; OMA: entry
Species	Human	Mouse
Entrez	390243	64931
Ensembl	ENSG00000183560	ENSMUSG00000031933
UniProt	A6ND01	Q9EQF4
RefSeq (mRNA)	NM_001080486; NM_001199206; NM_001393610	NM_022888; NM_176807
RefSeq (protein)	NP_001186135	NP_075026; NP_789777
Location (UCSC)	Chr 11: 94.3 – 94.31 Mb	Chr 9: 14.8 – 14.82 Mb
PubMed search
- Wikidata
View/Edit Human	View/Edit Mouse

Sperm-egg fusion protein Juno also known as folate receptor 4, or folate receptor delta is a protein that in humans is encoded by the IZUM01R gene. Juno is a member of the folate receptor family and is GPI-anchored to the plasmalemma of the mammalian egg cell that recognizes its sperm-riding counterpart, IZUMO1, and facilitates fertilization. The protein was named after Juno, the Roman goddess of fertility and marriage.

After the initial fertilisation stage, a sudden decrease of Juno from the egg cell surface occurs and Juno becomes virtually undetectable after just 40 minutes. Still, after fertilization via intracytoplasmic sperm injection, the egg cell does not lose cell-surface expression of Juno, which suggests that Juno contributes to the prevention of polyspermy. Mice lacking Juno on the surface of their egg cells are infertile because their egg cells do not fuse with normal sperm, demonstrating Juno's essential role in the fertility of female mice.

== Discovery ==
Based on a sequence homology search for genes relate to the folate receptor, the gene for folate receptor 4 was first identified in mice and humans in 2000 at the University of Nebraska–Lincoln.

In 2014, the function of folate receptor 4 was discovered by the researchers of the Wellcome Trust Sanger Institute who also proposed that the protein be renamed as Juno. Juno was initially found in murine oocytes, but its interaction with Izumo was subsequently found in other mammalian species, including humans. Being previously elusive, Juno was discovered nine years after its male counterpart, Izumo1.

== 3D structure ==
The crystal structure of Juno (PDB: 5EJN) was reported in February 2016 by researchers at Karolinska Institutet, in collaboration with the group at the Wellcome Trust Sanger Institute.
