= Cortical granule =

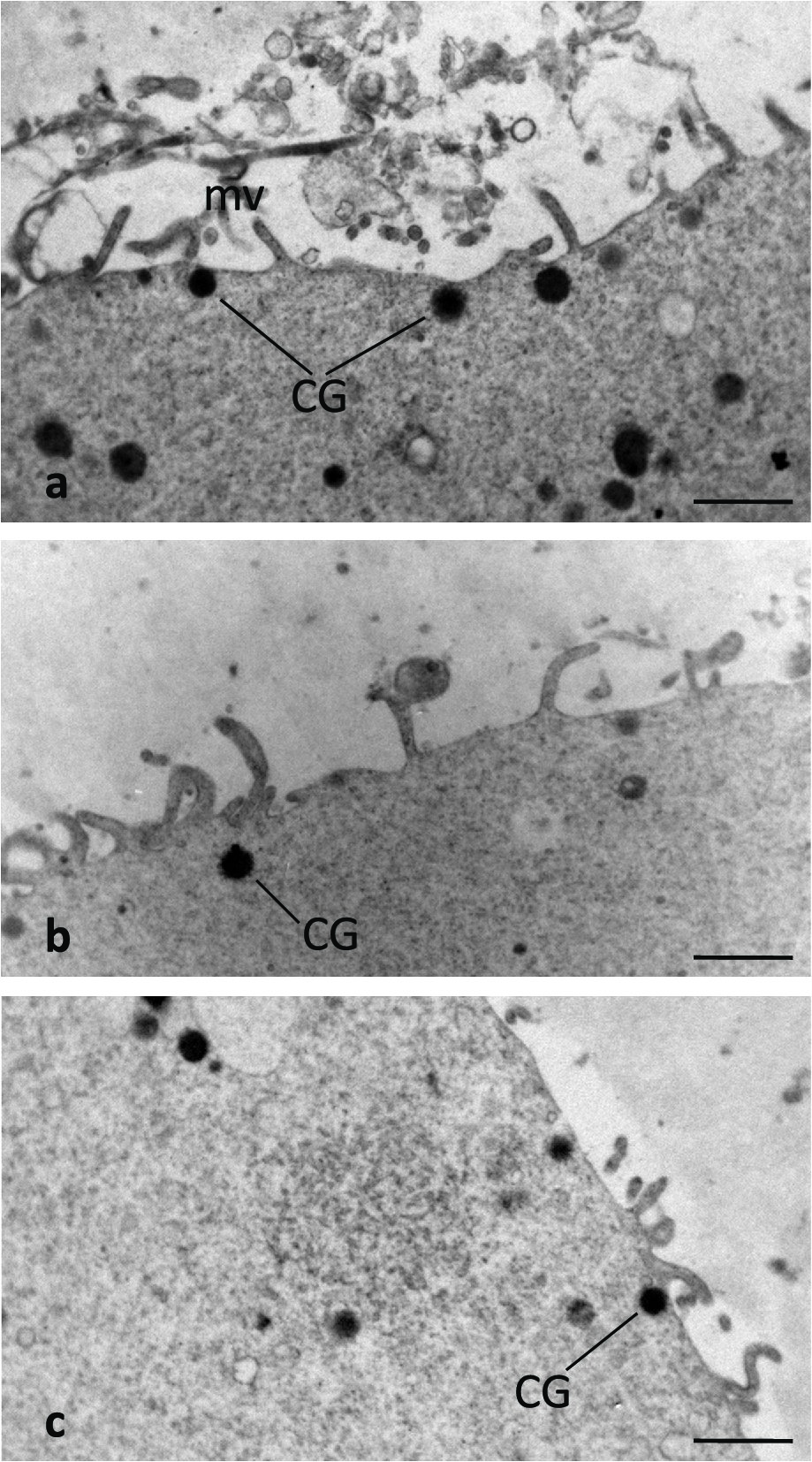
Cortical granule (CG) distribution within cortex of human oocyte at metaphase II

Cortical granules are membrane-bound organelles that function as regulatory secretory vesicles in oocytes. They range from 0.2 μm to 0.6 μm in diameter, and are most associated with polyspermy prevention after fertilization.

Cortical granules are found among all mammals, many vertebrates, and some invertebrates.

They are located along the cortex, the outer region of the oocyte. Following fertilization, a signaling pathway induces the cortical reaction, whereby the cortical granules fuse with the oocyte's cell membrane and release their contents into the extracellular matrix to modify the zona pellucida. The induction of the cortical granules is part of oocyte activation.

The alteration of the zona pellucida components is known as the zona reaction. The cortical reaction does not occur in all mammals, suggesting the likelihood of other functional purposes for cortical granules. In addition to modifying the oocyte's extracellular matrix and establishing a block to polyspermy, the exocytosis of cortical granules may also contribute towards protection and support of the developing embryo during preimplantation. Once the cortical granules complete their functions, the oocyte does not replenish them.

== Formation ==
Cortical granule formation occurs during the early stages of oocyte growth. More specifically, in the human, monkey, hamster, and rabbit, cortical granules are established once the ovarian follicle is multilayered. In the rat and mouse, cortical granules have been observed earlier in follicle development when the ovarian follicle is only single layered. During the early stages of oocyte growth, the Golgi complex increases in size, proliferates, and produces small vesicles that migrate to the cell's subcortical region. These small vesicles will fuse with one another to form mature cortical granules, which are thus established as separate entities from the Golgi. In some organisms, such as in hamsters, the secreted vesicle from the Golgi may fuse with a secreted vesicle from the rough endoplasmic reticulum to ultimately form a cortical granule. In mammals, the oocyte continuously produces and translocates cortical granules to the cortex until ovulation occurs. It has been shown in both mammalian and non-mammalian animal models that cortical granule migration depends on cytoskeleton processes, particularly microfilament activity. For mammals, cortical granule migration is considered an indication of oocyte maturity and organelle organization.

== Distribution ==
As a result of translocation, cortical granules are evenly distributed throughout the cortex of the oocyte. However, it has been observed in rodents that some cortical granules are rearranged leaving a space amidst the remaining cortical granules. This space is called the cortical granule free domain (CGFD) and has been observed in both the cell's meiotic spindle regions during metaphase I and metaphase II of meiosis. CGFDs have not been observed in feline, equine, bovine, porcine, nor human oocytes. Studies with rodent oocytes suggest that certain cortical granules undergo redistribution and/or exocytosis throughout the meiotic cycle thus establishing the CGFDs. More specifically, evidence includes increased quantities of cortical granules surrounding the CGFDs and a decreased overall quantity of the cell's cortical granules during the meiotic cycle. Additionally, some pre-fertilization cortical granule exocytotic events occur in the cell's cleavage furrow simultaneously with polar body formation.

An assortment of hypotheses exist concerning the biological function of CGFDs and pre-fertilization cortical granule exocytosis. For instance, the formation of the CGFDs may be the oocyte's mechanism for retaining more cortical granules for future use rather than losing them to the polar bodies as the polar bodies extrude from the cell. Because some cortical granules released are from a region near the meiotic spindles, researchers have also hypothesized that the released cortical granules may modify the oocyte's extracellular matrix so that sperm cannot bind in this region. If sperm were to bind in this region, the paternal DNA, as it decondenses, could possibly disrupt the integrity of the maternal DNA due to its proximity. This blocking of sperm at a specific site is termed local blocking. Considering that rodent oocytes have around 75% less surface area than oocytes of larger mammalian species, sperm binding in this region is more probable thereby possibly necessitating the need for local blocking. Researchers also hypothesize the oocyte releases some cortical granules pre-fertilzation in order to make minor modifications to the oocyte's extracellular matrix so that binding is limited to only sperm capable of binding despite these minor modifications.

== Regulation ==
Following fertilization and prior to the calcium release, an inositol phosphate signaling cascade is initiated. Throughout this process, second messenger molecules such as, inositol 1,4,5-trisphosphate (IP_{3}) and diacylglycerol (DAG), increase in concentration. IP_{3} has been shown to interact with the endoplasmic reticulum causing the release of the endoplasmic reticulum's calcium stores. Further emphasizing the relationship between the endoplasmic reticulum and cortical granules, during oocyte maturation, endoplasmic reticulum has been observed to either grow or migrate closer toward the region of cortical granules. In addition to calcium, diacylglycerol appears to initiate the cortical reaction. Diacyglycerol also activates Protein Kinase C (PKC), which promotes the cortical reaction as well. Upon fertilization, Protein Kinase C has been shown to promote the sperm's acrosomal exocytosis, a process homologous to that of the oocyte's cortical granule exocytosis. Similar to Protein Kinase C, calmodulin is activated by calcium, further promoting the cortical reaction.

This calcium increase occurs as a single wave in echinoderms and as multiple waves in mammals. Cortical granule exocytosis has been shown to occur directly following a calcium wave. For example, in the fertilized sea urchin egg, it has been shown that the cortical granule exocytosis immediately follows the calcium increase after approximately 6 seconds. In mammals, the first calcium wave occurs within 1–4 minutes following fertilization, and cortical granule exocytosis occurs within 5–30 minutes following fertilization. Furthermore, when calcium waves were suppressed experimentally, cortical granule exocytosis and/or alterations in the extracellular matrix did not occur. As demonstrated in unfertilized vertebrate oocytes, cortical granule exocytosis is induced when calcium is artificially increased.

Increased calcium is also thought to activate actin-depolymerizing proteins such as gelsolin and scinderin. In mammals, these actin-depolymerizing proteins serve to disassemble cortical actin thereby allowing space for cortical granule translocation toward the plasma membrane.

An oocyte acquires the ability to complete cortical granule exocytosis by the time the oocyte has reached late maturity. More specifically, in mice, for example, the ability to undergo cortical granule exocytosis arises some time between metaphase I and metaphase II of meiosis, which is also 5 hours before ovulation occurs. The oocyte has been shown to obtain maximum proficiency for releasing calcium at this same cell stage, between metaphase I and metaphase II, as well, further emphasizing the calcium-dependency of the cortical granule exocytosis event.

== Organelle composition ==
Although the entire cortical granule composition has yet to be identified, the following molecules have been associated as mammalian cortical granule content:

Glycosylated components: Mammalian cortical granules have been shown to contain high levels of carbohydrates. Furthermore, many of these carbohydrates are components of glycosylated molecules such as mannosylated proteins, α-D-acetylgalactosamine, N-acetylglucosamine, N-acetyllactosamine, N-acetylneuraminic acid, D-N-acetylgalactosamine, N-acetylgalactosamine, and N-glycolylneuraminic acid. Certain mannosylated proteins, for instance, are thought to contribute to the cortical granule's envelope structure.

Proteinases: The proteinases present in mammalian cortical granules primarily serve to modify the zona pelucida during the zona reaction. Some associated cortical granule proteinases are the trypsin-like proteinase, ZP2 proteinase, and tissue-type plasminogen activator (tPA). Both the ZP2 proteinase and trypsin-like proteinase contribute to polyspermy prevention. As its name suggests, ZP2 proteinase proteolyzes ZP2 during the zona reaction. Tissue-type plasminogen activator (tPA) is a serine proteinase that transforms plasminogen into its activated form, plasmin. Tissue-type plasminogen's presence has been recorded during the cortical reaction. Despite this association with the cortical reaction, however, evidence has yet to be found supporting that the tissue-type plasminogen activator is a cortical granule component. Furthermore, mRNA coding for tissue-type plasminogen activator is not translated until after most cortical granules have formed within the oocyte.

Ovoperoxidase: The protein, ovoperoxidase, most likely acts as a catalyst that cross-links tyrosine residues found within the zona pellucida. This cross-linking contributes to the hardening of the zona pellucida.

Calreticulin: Evidence has indicated the presence of the protein, calreticulin, within the cortical granule. Researchers have suggested that calreticulin serves as a chaperone protein for other cortical granule components contributing to polyspermy prevention. Additionally contributing to polyspermy prevention, calreticulin may also inhibit certain glycoproteins, which promote interaction between the oocyte and sperm. On the other hand, different research has shown that calreticulin may be released from vesicles other than cortical granules. Furthermore, upon exocytosis, this calreticulin interacts with the oocyte's cytoskeleton, thereby allowing the transmission of transmembrane signaling for the continuance of the cell's cycle.

N-Acetylglucosaminidase: Experimentally found within mouse cortical granules, N-Acetylglucosaminidase is a glycosidase that hydrolyzes N-acetylglucosamine residues located on the zona pellucida. N-acetylglucosamines on the zona pellucida normally promote sperm binding. Therefore, N-Acetylglucosaminidase contributes to polyspermy prevention.

p32: The name, p32, refers to the protein's molecular weight, 32 kDa. Upon release from the cortical granule, p32 appears to either function briefly or undergo a modification shortly after fertilization because only small amounts of p32 are present on the embryo. Research also suggests that p32 does not contribute to polyspermy prevention.

Peptidylarginine deiminase (PAD/ABL2 antigen/p75): Peptidylarginine deiminase is a secretory protein within the cortical granule that contributes to regulation of the embryo's development prior to the event of implantation. Peptidylarginine deiminase's alternative name, p75, refers to its molecular weight, 75kDa.
