= Acrosome reaction =

Sperm-meets-egg process

Acrosome reaction on a sea urchin cell

For fertilization to happen between a sperm and egg cell, a sperm must first fuse with the plasma membrane and then penetrate the female egg cell to fertilize it. While the fusion of the sperm cell with the egg cell's plasma membrane is relatively straightforward, penetrating the egg's protective layers, such as the zona pellucida, presents a significant challenge. Therefore, sperm cells go through a process known as the acrosome reaction, which is the reaction that occurs in the acrosome of the sperm as it approaches the egg.

The acrosome is a membrane-bound organelle of Golgi apparatus origin, commonly located at the tip of the head of the mature spermatozoon, which contains a variety of enzymes and antigens required for fertilization. It was once called "apical body" because of its location, or "perforatorium" on the assumption that it might assist the spermatozoon boring into the egg.

Acrosomal Reaction

As the sperm approaches the zona pellucida of the egg, which is necessary for initiating the acrosome reaction, the membrane surrounding the acrosome fuses with the plasma membrane of the sperm's head, exposing the contents of the acrosome. The contents include surface antigens necessary for binding to the egg's cell membrane, and numerous enzymes which are responsible for breaking through the egg's tough coating and allowing fertilization to occur.

== Variations among species ==
There are considerable species variations in the morphology and consequences of the acrosome reaction. In several species, the trigger for the acrosome reaction has been identified in a layer that surrounds the egg.

=== Echinoderms ===
In some echinoderms, a protuberance (the acrosomal process) forms at the apex of the sperm head, supported by a core of actin microfilaments. The membrane at the tip of the acrosomal process fuses with the egg's plasma membrane.

In some echinoderms, including starfish and sea urchins, a significant portion of the exposed acrosomal content contains a protein that temporarily holds the sperm on the egg's surface.

=== Mammals ===
In mammals, the acrosome reaction releases hyaluronidase and acrosin; their role in fertilization is not yet clear. The acrosomal reaction is initiated when sperm comes into contact with the oocyte's zona pellucida. Upon coming into contact with the zona pellucida, the acrosomal enzymes begin to dissolve, and the actin filament comes into contact with the zona pellucida. Once the two meet, a calcium influx occurs, causing a signaling cascade. The cortical granules inside the oocyte then fuse to the outer membrane, and a quick fast block reaction occurs.

Furthermore, the cortical granules inside the oocyte fuse with the outer membrane, initiating a rapid block reaction. This reaction alters a patch of pre-existing sperm plasma membrane, facilitating fusion with the egg plasma membrane.

A sperm penetration assay includes an acrosome reaction test that assesses how well a sperm can perform during the fertilization process. Sperm that are unable to go through the acrosome reaction properly will not be able to fertilize an egg. However, this problem only occurs in about 5% of men that have the test done. This test is rather expensive and provides limited information on a man's fertility.

In other cases, such as in the wood mouse Apodemus sylvaticus, premature acrosome reactions have been found to cause increased motility in aggregates of spermatozoa promoting fertilization.

== The process ==
The acrosomal reaction typically occurs in the ampulla of the fallopian tube, the site of fertilization, when the sperm penetrates the secondary oocyte. Prior events prepare for the acrosome reaction. The sperm cell undergoes a series of changes, including acquiring a "hyperactive motility pattern" where its flagellum produces vigorous whip-like movements propelling the sperm through the cervical canal and uterine cavity until it reaches the isthmus of the fallopian tube. Various mechanisms, including chemotaxis, aid the sperm in approaching the ovum in the ampulla of the fallopian tube. Once in close proximity, glycoproteins on the outer surface of the sperm bind with glycoproteins on the zona pellucida of the ovum.

Sperm that fail to initiate the acrosome reaction prior to reaching to the zona pellucida are unable to penetrate the zona pellucida. Since the acrosome reaction has already occurred, sperm are then able to penetrate the zona pellucida due to mechanical action of the tail, not because of the acrosome reaction itself.

The first stage is the penetration of corona radiata, by releasing hyaluronidase from the acrosome to digest cumulus cells surrounding the oocyte and exposing acrosin attached to the inner membrane of the sperm. The cumulus cells are embedded in a gel-like substance made primarily of hyaluronic acid, and developed in the ovary with the egg and support it as it grows.

Acrosin, once exposed, digests the zona pellucida and membrane of the oocyte, allowing for penetration to happen. Part of the sperm's cell membrane then fuses with the egg cell's membrane, and the contents of the head sink into the egg. In the mouse, it has been demonstrated that ZP3, one of the proteins that make up the zona pellucida, binds to a partner molecule (to the β1,4-galactosyl transferase receptors) on the sperm. This lock-and-key type mechanism is species-specific and prevents the sperm and egg of different species from fusing. The zona pellucida also releases Ca granules, which prevent other sperm from binding. There is some evidence that this binding is what triggers the acrosome to release the enzymes that allow the sperm to fuse with the egg. A similar mechanism likely occurs in other mammals, but the diversity of zona proteins across species means that the relevant protein and receptor may differ.

More recent scientific evidence demonstrates that the acrosomal reaction is necessary to expose a protein called IZUMO1 on the sperm: without the reaction, sperm can still penetrate through the zona pellucida to the egg membrane, but cannot fuse. As seen in mouse studies, IZUMO1 binds to the oocyte protein JUNO and once bound together, the sperm and the egg fuse together to form two pronuclei. These pronuclei supply the zygote with the genetic material necessary for the formation of an embryo. Additionally, once the fusion of the sperm and oocyte is complete, phospholipase C zeta is released from the sperm.

Following penetration and fusion, if all is normally occurring, the process of egg-activation occurs facilitated by proteins like phospholipase C zeta, and the oocyte is said to have become activated. This is thought to be induced by a specific protein phospholipase c zeta. It undergoes its secondary meiotic division, and the two haploid nuclei (paternal and maternal) fuse to form a zygote. Several changes to the egg's cell membranes render them impenetrable shortly after the first sperm enters the egg (such as the rapid loss of JUNO); these prevent polyspermy and minimize the possibility of producing a triploid zygote.

== Spontaneous acrosome reaction ==
Spermatozoa can initiate the acrosomal reaction well in advance of reaching the zona pellucida, as well as in vitro in an appropriate culture medium. This is referred to as spontaneous acrosome reaction (SAR).

It is now known that, in a certain sense, this phenomenon is physiologically normal across mammalian species. The acrosome reaction is induced by passage through the cumulus oophorus cells, mediated by the hormones they secrete (such as progesterone, LPA, LPC).

However, the physiological role of truly spontaneous acrosomal reaction, occurring well before this point in the female reproductive tract, or in vitro, is a separate phenomenon.

In mice, it has been well established as physiologically normal and common. Mouse sperm which have undergone fully spontaneous acrosome reaction are still able to fertilize eggs. Furthermore, the rate of spontaneous acrosome reaction is higher in more promiscuous species such as Apodemus sylvaticus, which face a high level of sperm competition.

In humans, on the other hand, it remains disputed where exactly the acrosome reaction is initiated in physiological fertilization, due to experimental constraints (for example, animal studies may make use of transgenic mice with fluorescent sperm, while human studies cannot).

Studies have been done with the intent of linking in vitro SAR rate in human sperm to sperm quality and fertilization rate, but as of 2018, the overall results have been mixed, and do not seem to be clinically informative.

== In in vitro fertilization ==
When using intracytoplasmic sperm injection (ICSI) for IVF, the implantation rate is higher in oocytes injected with spermatozoa that have undergone acrosome reaction (~40%) vs. those injected with nonreacted spermatozoa (~10%). The implantation rate is ~25% in when injected with both reacted and nonreacted spermatozoa. The delivery rate per cycle follows the same trend.

The acrosome reaction can be stimulated in vitro by substances a sperm cell may encounter naturally, such as progesterone or follicular fluid, as well as the more commonly used calcium ionophore A23187.

=== Assessment ===
Birefringence microscopy, flow cytometry or fluorescence microscopy can be used for assessing the shedding of the acrosome or "acrosome reaction" of a sperm sample. Flow cytometry and fluorescence microscopy are usually done after staining with a fluoresceinated lectin such as FITC-PNA, FITC-PSA, FITC-ConA, or fluoresceinated antibody such as FITC-CD46. The antibodies/lectins have a high specificity for different parts of the acrosomal region, and will only bind to a specific site (acrosomal content/ inner/outer membrane). If bound to a fluorescent molecule, regions where these probes have bound can be visualised. Sperm cells with artificially induced acrosome reactions may serve as positive controls.

For fluorescence microscopy, a smear of washed sperm cells is made, air-dried, permeabilized, and then stained. Such a slide is then viewed under the light of a wavelength that will cause the probe to fluoresce if it is bound to the acrosomal region. At least 200 cells are considered arbitrarily and classified as either acrosome intact (fluorescing bright green), or acrosome reacted (no probe present, or only on the equatorial region). It is then expressed as a percentage of the counted cells.

For assessment with flow cytometry, the washed cells are incubated with the chosen probe, possibly passed again, then sampled in a flow cytometer. After gating the cell population according to forward- and side-scatter, the resulting data can be analyzed (e.g. mean fluorescences compared). With this technique, a probe for viability such as propidium iodide (PI) could also be included in order to exclude dead cells from the acrosome assessment, since many sperm cells will spontaneously lose their acrosome when they die.

== See also ==
- Cortical reaction
- Hamster zona-free ovum test
- ZP3
