= Izumo sperm-egg fusion protein 1 =

Protein-coding gene in the species Homo sapiens

IZUMO1

Identifiers
- Aliases: IZUMO1, IZUMO, OBF, izumo sperm-egg fusion 1
- External IDs: OMIM: 609278; MGI: 1920706; GeneCards: IZUMO1
Available structures
PDB	Ortholog search: PDBe RCSB
PDB	List of PDB id codes 5JKD, 5F4T, 5JKC, 5JK9, 5JKE, 5F4V, 5F4E

Gene location (Human)
Chr.	Chromosome 19 (human)
Band	19q13.33	Start	48,740,852 bp
Band	19q13.33	End	48,746,909 bp

Gene location (Mouse)
Chr.	Chromosome 7 (mouse)
Band	7|7 B3	Start	45,621,811 bp
Band	7|7 B3	End	45,628,823 bp
RNA expression pattern
Bgee	Human / Mouse (ortholog); Top expressed in: right testis; left testis; sperm; body of pancreas; upper lobe of left lung; right hemisphere of cerebellum; body of stomach; right adrenal cortex; right lung; apex of heart / Top expressed in: spermatid; seminiferous tubule; spermatocyte; embryo; blastocyst; embryo; yolk sac; epiblast; lip; esophagus; More reference expression data
BioGPS	n/a
Gene ontology
Molecular function	signaling receptor binding; protein homodimerization activity; protein binding; identical protein binding; protein binding involved in heterotypic cell-cell adhesion
Cellular component	membrane; integral component of membrane; plasma membrane; acrosomal membrane; cytoplasmic vesicle
Biological process	cell adhesion; sperm-egg recognition; single fertilization; fusion of sperm to egg plasma membrane involved in single fertilization; heterotypic cell-cell adhesion
Sources:Amigo / QuickGO
Orthologs
Databases	NCBI: entry; OMA: entry
Species	Human	Mouse
Entrez	284359	73456
Ensembl	ENSG00000182264	ENSMUSG00000064158
UniProt	Q8IYV9	Q9D9J7
RefSeq (mRNA)	NM_182575; NM_001321864; NM_001321865	NM_001018013
RefSeq (protein)	NP_001308793; NP_001308794; NP_872381	NP_001018013
Location (UCSC)	Chr 19: 48.74 – 48.75 Mb	Chr 7: 45.62 – 45.63 Mb
PubMed search
- Wikidata
View/Edit Human	View/Edit Mouse

Izumo sperm-egg fusion protein 1 (Sperm-specific protein izumo) is encoded in humans by the IZUMO1 gene. In mammalian fertilisation, IZUMO1 binds to its egg receptor counterpart, Juno, to facilitate recognition and fusion of the gametes.

== Function ==
The sperm-specific protein Izumo, named for a Japanese shrine dedicated to marriage, is essential for sperm-egg plasma membrane binding and fusion.

Studies have shown that male Izumo knockout mice are sterile because their sperm are unable to fuse to the oocyte membrane.[1] Izumo -/- mice produced morphologically normal sperm that were able to penetrate the zona pellucida, but could not fuse with to the eggs. In fact, it is necessary to relocate the IZUMO1 to the site of oocyte fusion. In-vitro human experiments have also been conducted, suggesting that Izumo is required for human gamete fusion. [1]

Through the use of Western Blot analyses, it has been shown that Izumo is only expressed in the testis and is found on mature spermatozoa. Izumo-1 located on mature spermatozoa that have undergone capacitation binds to its receptor Juno, which is located on the oolemma of eggs.
