= Perivitelline space =

Middle membrane of Ovum

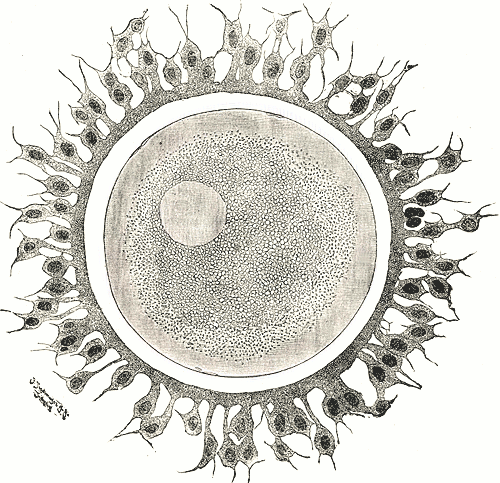
- Human ovum. The zona pellucida is seen as a thick clear girdle surrounded by the cells of the corona radiata. The perivitelline space is between the zona pellucida and the oocyte membrane.

The perivitelline space is the space between the zona pellucida and the cell membrane of an oocyte or fertilized ovum. In the slow block to polyspermy, the cortical granules released from the ovum are deposited in the perivitelline space. Polysaccharides released in the granules cause the space to swell, pushing the zona pellucida further from the oocyte. The hydrolytic enzymes released by the granules cause the zona reaction, which removes the ZP3 ligands from the zona pellucida.

== Clinical importance ==
Clinically, the perivitelline space is relevant because it is where the polar body lodges after meiosis.
