= Corona radiata (embryology) =

Cellular mantle around egg cell

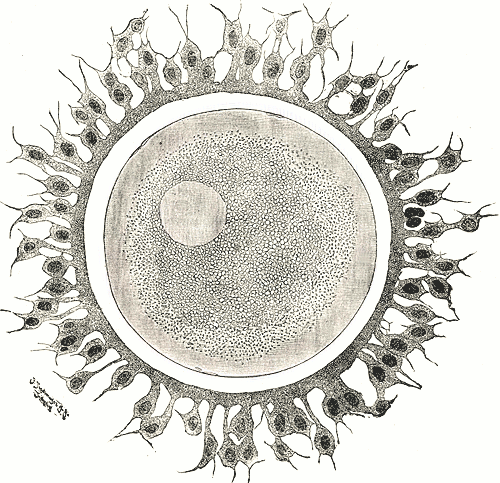
- Human ovum examined fresh in the follicular fluid. The zona pellucida is seen as a thick clear girdle surrounded by the cells of the corona radiata. The egg itself shows a central granular deutoplasmic area and a peripheral clear layer, and encloses the germinal vesicle, in which is seen the germinal spot.

The corona radiata is the innermost layer of the cells of the cumulus oophorus and is directly adjacent to the zona pellucida, the inner protective glycoprotein layer of the ovum. Cumulus oophorus are the cells surrounding corona radiata, and are the cells between corona radiata and follicular antrum. Its main purpose in many animals is to supply vital proteins to the cell. It is formed by follicle cells adhering to the oocyte before it leaves the ovarian follicle, and originates from the squamous granulosa cells present at the primordial stage of follicular development. The corona radiata is formed when the granulosa cells enlarge and become cuboidal, which occurs during the transition from the primordial to primary stage. These cuboidal granulosa cells, also known as the granulosa radiata, form more layers throughout the maturation process, and remain attached to the zona pellucida after the ovulation of the Graafian follicle. For fertilization to occur, sperm cells rely on hyaluronidase (an enzyme found in the acrosome of spermatozoa) to disperse the corona radiata from the zona pellucida, thus permitting entry into the perivitelline space and allowing contact between the sperm cell and the nucleus of the egg cell.
