= Fertilisation =

Union of opposite-sex gametes in sexual reproduction to form a zygote

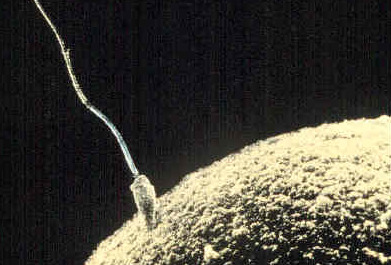
Sperm and ovum fusing

Fertilisation or fertilization (see spelling differences), also known as generative fertilisation, syngamy and impregnation, is the fusion of gametes to give rise to a zygote and initiate its development into a new individual organism or offspring. While processes such as insemination or pollination, which happen before the fusion of gametes, are also sometimes informally referred to as fertilisation, these are technically separate processes. The cycle of fertilisation and development of new individuals is called sexual reproduction. During double fertilisation in angiosperms, the haploid male gamete combines with two haploid polar nuclei to form a triploid primary endosperm nucleus by the process of vegetative fertilisation.

== Discovery ==
In antiquity, Aristotle conceived the formation of new individuals through fusion of male and female fluids, with form and function emerging gradually, in a mode called by him as epigenetic.

In 1784, Spallanzani established the need of interaction between the female's ovum and male's sperm to form a zygote in frogs. In 1827, Karl Ernst von Baer observed a therian mammalian egg for the first time. Oscar Hertwig (1876), in Germany, described the fusion of nuclei of spermatozoa and of ova of sea urchins.

== Evolution ==
The evolution of fertilisation is related to the origin of meiosis, as both are part of sexual reproduction, originated in eukaryotes. One hypothesis states that meiosis originated from mitosis.

== Fertilisation in plants ==
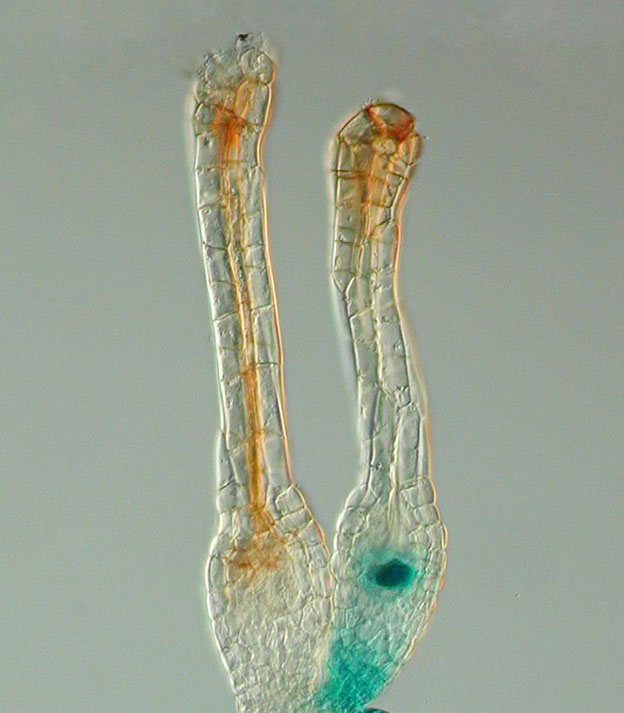
In the bryophyte land plants, fertilisation takes place within the archegonium. This moss has been genetically modified so that the unfertilised egg within the archegonium produces a blue colour.

The gametes that participate in fertilisation of plants are the sperm (male) and the egg (female) cell. Various plant groups have differing methods by which the gametes produced by the male and female gametophytes come together and are fertilised. In bryophytes and pteridophytic land plants, fertilisation of the sperm and egg takes place within the archegonium. In seed plants, the male gametophyte is formed within a pollen grain. After pollination, the pollen grain germinates, and a pollen tube grows and penetrates the ovule through a tiny pore called a micropyle. The sperm are transferred from the pollen through the pollen tube to the ovule where the egg is fertilised. In flowering plants, two sperm cells are released from the pollen tube, and a second fertilisation event occurs involving the second sperm cell and the central cell of the ovule, which is a second female gamete.

=== Pollen tube growth ===
Unlike animal sperm which is motile, the sperm of most seed plants is immotile and relies on the pollen tube to carry it to the ovule where the sperm is released. The pollen tube penetrates the stigma and elongates through the extracellular matrix of the style before reaching the ovary. Then near the receptacle, it breaks through the ovule through the micropyle (an opening in the ovule wall) and the pollen tube "bursts" into the embryo sac, releasing sperm. The growth of the pollen tube has been believed to depend on chemical cues from the pistil, however these mechanisms were poorly understood until 1995. Work done on tobacco plants revealed a family of glycoproteins called TTS proteins that enhanced growth of pollen tubes. Pollen tubes in a sugar free pollen germination medium and a medium with purified TTS proteins both grew. However, in the TTS medium, the tubes grew at a rate 3x that of the sugar-free medium. TTS proteins were also placed on various locations of semi in vivo pollinated pistils, and pollen tubes were observed to immediately extend toward the proteins. Transgenic plants lacking the ability to produce TTS proteins had slower pollen tube growth and reduced fertility.

=== Rupture of pollen tube ===
The rupture of the pollen tube to release sperm in Arabidopsis has been shown to depend on a signal from the female gametophyte. Specific proteins called FER protein kinases present in the ovule control the production of highly reactive derivatives of oxygen called reactive oxygen species (ROS). ROS levels have been shown via GFP to be at their highest during floral stages when the ovule is the most receptive to pollen tubes, and lowest during times of development and following fertilisation. High amounts of ROS activate calcium ion channels in the pollen tube, causing these channels to take up calcium ions in large amounts. This increased uptake of calcium causes the pollen tube to rupture, and release its sperm into the ovule. Pistil feeding assays in which plants were fed diphenyl iodonium chloride (DPI) suppressed ROS concentrations in Arabidopsis, which in turn prevented pollen tube rupture.

=== Flowering plants ===
After being fertilised, the ovary starts to swell and develop into the fruit. With multi-seeded fruits, multiple grains of pollen are necessary for syngamy with each ovule. The growth of the pollen tube is controlled by the vegetative (or tube) cytoplasm. Hydrolytic enzymes are secreted by the pollen tube that digest the female tissue as the tube grows down the stigma and style; the digested tissue is used as a nutrient source for the pollen tube as it grows. During pollen tube growth towards the ovary, the generative nucleus divides to produce two separate sperm nuclei (haploid number of chromosomes) – a growing pollen tube therefore contains three separate nuclei, two sperm and one tube. The sperms are interconnected and dimorphic, the large one, in a number of plants, is also linked to the tube nucleus and the interconnected sperm and the tube nucleus form the "male germ unit".

Double fertilisation is the process in angiosperms (flowering plants) in which two sperm from each pollen tube fertilise two cells in a female gametophyte (sometimes called an embryo sac) that is inside an ovule. After the pollen tube enters the gametophyte, the pollen tube nucleus disintegrates and the two sperm cells are released; one of the two sperm cells fertilises the egg cell (at the bottom of the gametophyte near the micropyle), forming a diploid (2n) zygote. This is the point when fertilisation actually occurs; pollination and fertilisation are two separate processes. The nucleus of the other sperm cell fuses with two haploid polar nuclei (contained in the central cell) in the centre of the gametophyte. The resulting cell is triploid (3n). This triploid cell divides through mitosis and forms the endosperm, a nutrient-rich tissue, inside the seed. The two central-cell maternal nuclei (polar nuclei) that contribute to the endosperm arise by mitosis from the single meiotic product that also gave rise to the egg. Therefore, maternal contribution to the genetic constitution of the triploid endosperm is double that of the embryo.

One primitive species of flowering plant, Nuphar polysepala, has an endosperm that is diploid, resulting from the fusion of a sperm with one, rather than two, maternal nuclei. It is believed that early in the development of angiosperm lineages, there was a duplication in this mode of reproduction, producing seven-celled/eight-nucleate female gametophytes, and triploid endosperms with a 2:1 maternal to paternal genome ratio.

In many plants, the development of the flesh of the fruit is proportional to the percentage of fertilised ovules. For example, with watermelon, about a thousand grains of pollen must be delivered and spread evenly on the three lobes of the stigma to make a normal sized and shaped fruit.

=== Self-pollination and outcrossing ===
Outcrossing, or cross-fertilisation, and self-fertilisation represent different strategies with differing benefits and costs. An estimated 48.7% of plant species are either dioecious or self-incompatible obligate outcrossers. It is also estimated that about 42% of flowering plants exhibit a mixed mating system in nature.

In the most common kind of mixed mating system, individual plants produce a single type of flower and fruits may contain self-fertilised, outcrossed or a mixture of progeny types. The transition from cross-fertilisation to self-fertilisation is the most common evolutionary transition in plants, and has occurred repeatedly in many independent lineages. About 10–15% of flowering plants are predominantly self-fertilising.

Under circumstances where pollinators or mates are rare, self-fertilisation offers the advantage of reproductive assurance. Self-fertilisation can therefore result in improved colonisation ability. In some species, self-fertilisation has persisted over many generations. Capsella rubella is a self-fertilising species that became self-compatible 50,000 to 100,000 years ago. Arabidopsis thaliana is a predominantly self-fertilising plant with an out-crossing rate in the wild of less than 0.3%; a study suggested that self-fertilisation evolved roughly a million years ago or more in A. thaliana. In long-established self-fertilising plants, the masking of deleterious mutations and the production of genetic variability is infrequent and thus unlikely to provide a sufficient benefit over many generations to maintain the meiotic apparatus. Consequently, one might expect self-fertilisation to be replaced in nature by an ameiotic asexual form of reproduction that would be less costly. However the actual persistence of meiosis and self-fertilisation as a form of reproduction in long-established self-fertilising plants may be related to the immediate benefit of efficient recombinational repair of DNA damage during formation of germ cells provided by meiosis at each generation.

== Fertilisation in animals ==
The mechanics behind fertilisation has been studied extensively in sea urchins and mice. This research addresses the question of how the sperm and the appropriate egg find each other and the question of how only one sperm gets into the egg and delivers its contents. There are three steps to fertilisation that ensure species-specificity:

1. Chemotaxis
2. Sperm activation/acrosomal reaction
3. Sperm/egg adhesion

=== Internal vs. external ===
Consideration as to whether an animal (more specifically a vertebrate) uses internal or external fertilisation is often dependent on the method of birth. Oviparous animals laying eggs with thick calcium shells, such as chickens, or thick leathery shells generally reproduce via internal fertilisation so that the sperm fertilises the egg without having to pass through the thick, protective, tertiary layer of the egg. Ovoviviparous and viviparous animals also use internal fertilisation. Although some organisms reproduce via amplexus, they may still use internal fertilisation, as with some salamanders. Advantages of internal fertilisation include minimal waste of gametes, greater chance of individual egg fertilisation, longer period of egg protection, and selective fertilisation. Many females have the ability to store sperm for extended periods of time and can fertilise their eggs at their own desire.

Oviparous animals producing eggs with thin tertiary membranes or no membranes at all, on the other hand, use external fertilisation methods. Such animals may be more precisely termed ovuliparous. External fertilisation is advantageous in that it minimises contact (which decreases the risk of disease transmission), and greater genetic variation.

=== Sea urchins ===
Acrosome reaction on a sea urchin cell.

Sperm find the eggs via chemotaxis, a type of ligand/receptor interaction. Resact is a 14 amino acid peptide purified from the jelly coat of A. punctulata that attracts the migration of sperm.

After finding the egg, the sperm penetrates the jelly coat through a process called sperm activation. In another ligand/receptor interaction, an oligosaccharide component of the egg binds and activates a receptor on the sperm and causes the acrosomal reaction. The acrosomal vesicles of the sperm fuse with the plasma membrane and are released. In this process, molecules bound to the acrosomal vesicle membrane, such as bindin, are exposed on the surface of the sperm. These contents digest the jelly coat and eventually the vitelline membrane. In addition to the release of acrosomal vesicles, there is explosive polymerisation of actin to form a thin spike at the head of the sperm called the acrosomal process.

The sperm binds to the egg through another ligand reaction between receptors on the vitelline membrane. The sperm surface protein bindin, binds to a receptor on the vitelline membrane identified as EBR1.

Fusion of the plasma membranes of the sperm and egg are likely mediated by bindin. At the site of contact, fusion causes the formation of a fertilisation cone.

=== Mammals ===
Sperm using hyaluronidase and acrosin to penetrate the corona radiata and zona pellucida to release genetic material into the ovum.

Sperm are ejaculated into the vagina during copulation and move to the upper vagina (via contractions from the vagina) through the cervix and across the length of the uterus to meet the ovum. In cases where fertilisation occurs, the female usually ovulates during a period that extends from hours before copulation to a few days after; therefore, in most mammals, it is more common for ejaculation to precede ovulation than vice versa.

When sperm are deposited into the anterior vagina, they are not capable of fertilisation (i.e., non-capacitated) and are characterised by slow linear motility patterns. This motility, combined with muscular contractions enables sperm transport towards the uterus and oviducts. There is a pH gradient within the micro-environment of the female reproductive tract such that the pH near the vaginal opening is lower (approximately 5) than the oviducts (approximately 8). The sperm-specific pH-sensitive calcium transport protein called CatSper increases the sperm cell permeability to calcium as it moves further into the reproductive tract. Intracellular calcium influx contributes to sperm capacitation and hyperactivation, causing a more violent and rapid non-linear motility pattern as sperm approach the oocyte. The capacitated spermatozoon and the oocyte meet and interact in the ampulla of the fallopian tube. Rheotaxis, thermotaxis and chemotaxis are known mechanisms that guide sperm towards the egg during the final stage of sperm migration. Spermatozoa respond (see Sperm thermotaxis) to the temperature gradient of ~2 °C between the oviduct and the ampulla, and chemotactic gradients of progesterone have been confirmed as the signal emanating from the cumulus oophorus cells surrounding rabbit and human oocytes. Capacitated and hyperactivated sperm respond to these gradients by changing their behaviour and moving towards the cumulus-oocyte complex. Other chemotactic signals such as formyl Met-Leu-Phe (fMLF) may also guide spermatozoa.

The zona pellucida, a thick layer of extracellular matrix that surrounds the egg and is similar to the role of the vitelline membrane in sea urchins, binds the sperm. Unlike sea urchins, the sperm binds to the egg before the acrosomal reaction. ZP3, a glycoprotein in the zona pellucida, is responsible for egg/sperm adhesion in humans. The receptor galactosyltransferase (GalT) binds to the N-acetylglucosamine residues on the ZP3 and is important for binding with the sperm and activating the acrosome reaction. ZP3 is sufficient though unnecessary for sperm/egg binding. Two additional sperm receptors exist: a 250kD protein that binds to an oviduct secreted protein, and SED1, which independently binds to the zona. After the acrosome reaction, the sperm is believed to remain bound to the zona pellucida through exposed ZP2 receptors. These receptors are unknown in mice but have been identified in guinea pigs.

In mammals, the binding of the spermatozoon to the GalT initiates the acrosome reaction. This process releases the hyaluronidase that digests the matrix of hyaluronic acid in the vestments around the oocyte. Additionally, heparin-like glycosaminoglycans (GAGs) are released near the oocyte that promote the acrosome reaction. Fusion between the oocyte plasma membranes and sperm follows and allows the sperm nucleus, the typical centriole, and atypical centriole that is attached to the flagellum, but not the mitochondria, to enter the oocyte. The protein CD9 likely mediates this fusion in mice (the binding homologue). The egg "activates" itself upon fusing with a single sperm cell and thereby changes its cell membrane to prevent fusion with other sperm. Zinc atoms are released during this activation.

This process ultimately leads to the formation of a diploid cell called a zygote. The zygote divides to form a blastocyst and, upon entering the uterus, implants in the endometrium, beginning pregnancy. Embryonic implantation not in the uterine wall results in an ectopic pregnancy that can kill the mother.

In such animals as rabbits, coitus induces ovulation by stimulating the release of the pituitary hormone gonadotropin; this release greatly increases the likelihood of pregnancy.

==== Humans ====
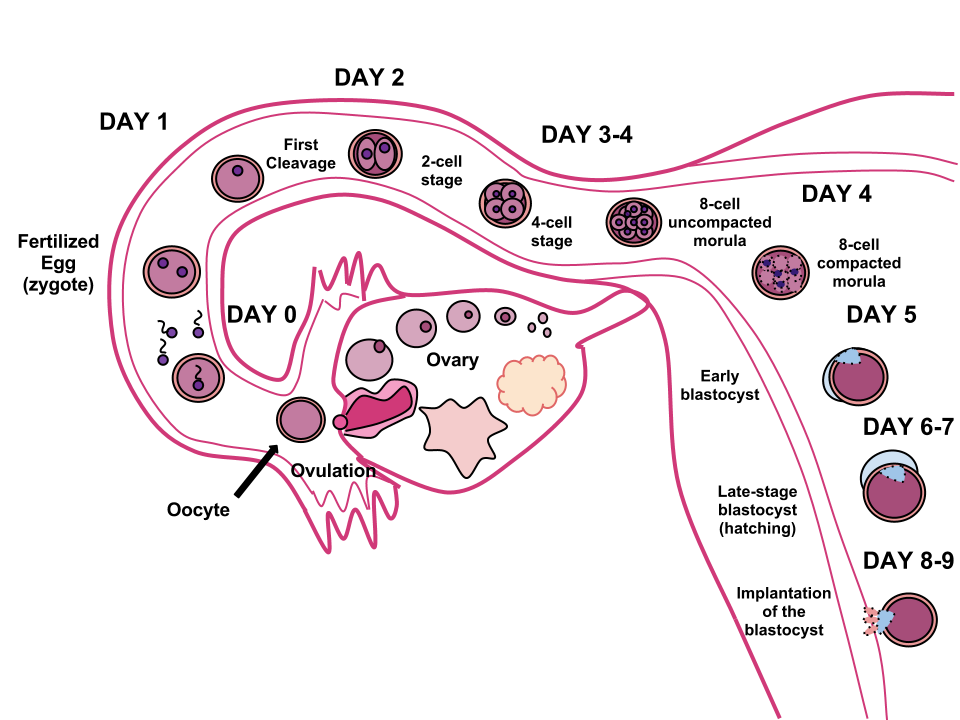
Fertilisation in humans. The sperm and ovum unite through fertilisation, creating a zygote that (over the course of 8–9 days) implants in the uterine wall, where it resides for nine months.

External videos
- Fertilisation (Conception) Nucleus Medical Media

Fertilisation in humans is the union of a human egg and sperm, usually occurring in the ampulla of the fallopian tube, producing a single celled zygote, the first stage in the development of a genetically unique organism, and initiating embryonic development. Scientists discovered the dynamics of human fertilisation in the nineteenth century.

The term conception commonly refers to "the process of becoming pregnant involving fertilisation or implantation or both". Its use makes it a subject of semantic arguments about the beginning of pregnancy, typically in the context of the abortion debate. Upon gastrulation, which occurs around 16 days after fertilisation, the implanted blastocyst develops three germ layers, the endoderm, the ectoderm and the mesoderm, and the genetic code of the father becomes fully involved in the development of the embryo; later twinning is impossible. Additionally, interspecies hybrids survive only until gastrulation and cannot further develop. However, some human developmental biology literature refers to the conceptus and such medical literature refers to the "products of conception" as the post-implantation embryo and its surrounding membranes. The term "conception" is not usually used in scientific literature because of its variable definition and connotation.

=== Insects ===
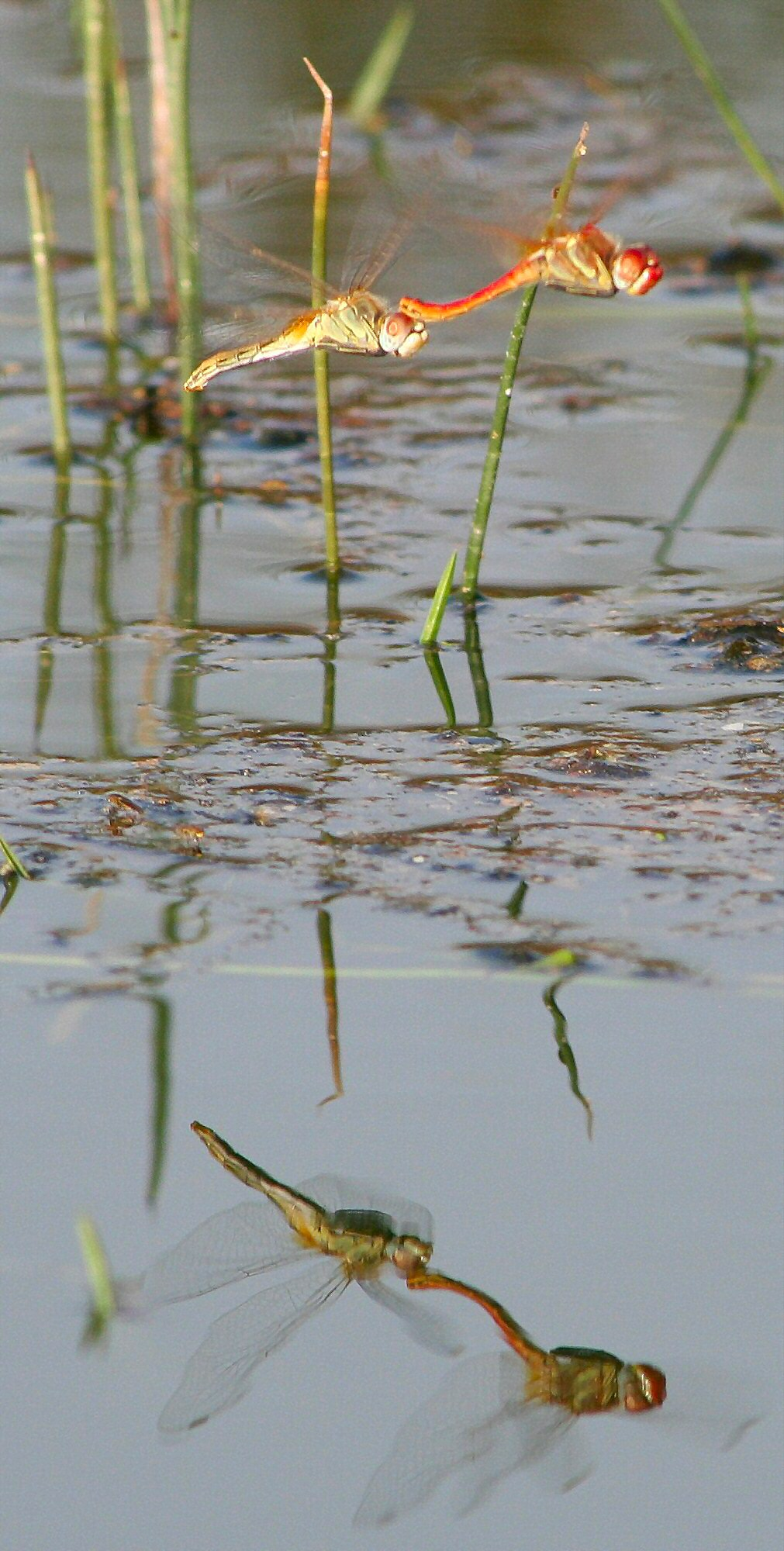
Red-veined darters (Sympetrum fonscolombii) flying "in cop" (male ahead), enabling the male to prevent other males from mating. The eggs are fertilised as they are laid, one at a time.

Insects in different groups, including the Odonata (dragonflies and damselflies) and the Hymenoptera (ants, bees, and wasps) practise delayed fertilisation. Among the Odonata, females may mate with multiple males, and store sperm until the eggs are laid. The male may hover above the female during egg-laying (oviposition) to prevent her from mating with other males and replacing his sperm; in some groups such as the darters, the male continues to grasp the female with his claspers during egg-laying, the pair flying around in tandem. Among social Hymenoptera, honeybee queens mate only on mating flights, in a short period lasting some days; a queen may mate with eight or more drones. She then stores the sperm for the rest of her life, perhaps for five years or more.

== Fertilisation in fungi ==
In many fungi (except chytrids), as in some protists, fertilisation is a two step process. First, the cytoplasms of the two gamete cells fuse (called plasmogamy), producing a dikaryotic or heterokaryotic cell with multiple nuclei. This cell may then divide to produce dikaryotic or heterokaryotic hyphae. The second step of fertilisation is karyogamy, the fusion of the nuclei to form a diploid zygote.

In chytrid fungi, fertilisation occurs in a single step with the fusion of gametes, as in animals and plants.

== Fertilisation in protists ==
=== Fertilisation in protozoa ===
There are three types of fertilisation processes in protozoa:

- gametogamy;
- autogamy;
- gamontogamy.

=== Fertilisation in algae ===
Algae, like some land plants, undergo alternation of generations. Some algae are isomorphic, where both the sporophyte (2n) and gametophyte (n) are the same morphologically. When algae reproduction is described as oogamous, the male and female gametes are different morphologically, where there is a large non-motile egg for female gametes, and the male gametes are uniflagellate (motile). Via the process of syngamy, these will form a new zygote, regenerating the sporophyte generation again.

== Fertilisation and genetic recombination ==
Meiosis results in a random segregation of the genes that each parent contributes. Each parent organism is usually identical save for a fraction of their genes; each gamete is therefore genetically unique. At fertilisation, parental chromosomes combine. In humans, (2^{22})^{2} = 17.6 × 10^{12} chromosomally different zygotes are possible for the non-sex chromosomes, even assuming no chromosomal crossover. If crossover occurs once, then on average (4²²)² = 309 × 10^{24} genetically different zygotes are possible for every couple, not considering that crossover events can take place at most points along each chromosome. The X and Y chromosomes undergo no crossover events and are therefore excluded from the calculation. The mitochondrial DNA is only inherited from the maternal parent.

== The sperm aster and zygote centrosomes ==
Shortly after the sperm fuse with the egg, the two sperm centrioles form the embryo first centrosome and microtubule aster. The sperm centriole, found near the male pronucleus, recruit egg Pericentriolar material proteins forming the zygote first centrosome. This centrosome nucleates microtubules in the shape of stars called astral microtubules. The microtubules span the whole valium of the egg, allowing the egg pronucleus to use the cables to get to the male pronucleus. As the male and female pronuclei approach each other, the single centrosome splits into two centrosomes located in the interphase between the pronuclei. Then the centrosome via the astral microtubules polarises the genome inside the pronuclei.

== Parthenogenesis ==
Organisms that normally reproduce sexually can also reproduce via parthenogenesis, wherein an unfertilised female gamete produces viable offspring. These offspring may be clones of the mother, or in some cases genetically differ from her but inherit only part of her DNA. Parthenogenesis occurs in many plants and animals and may be induced in others through a chemical or electrical stimulus to the egg cell. In 2004, Japanese researchers led by Tomohiro Kono succeeded after 457 attempts to merge the ova of two mice by blocking certain proteins that would normally prevent the possibility; the resulting embryo normally developed into a mouse.

== Allogamy and autogamy ==
Allogamy, which is also known as cross-fertilisation, refers to the fertilisation of an egg cell from one individual with the male gamete of another.

Autogamy which is also known as self-fertilisation, occurs in such hermaphroditic organisms as plants and flatworms; therein, two gametes from one individual fuse.

== Other variants of bisexual reproduction ==
Some relatively unusual forms of reproduction are:

Gynogenesis: A sperm stimulates the egg to develop without fertilisation or syngamy. The sperm may enter the egg.

Hybridogenesis: One genome is eliminated to produce haploid eggs.

Canina meiosis: (sometimes called "permanent odd polyploidy") one genome is transmitted in the Mendelian fashion, others are transmitted clonally.

== Benefits of cross-fertilisation ==
The major benefit of cross-fertilisation is generally thought to be the avoidance of inbreeding depression. Charles Darwin, in his 1876 book The Effects of Cross and Self Fertilisation in the Vegetable Kingdom (pages 466–467) summed up his findings in the following way.

"It has been shown in the present volume that the offspring from the union of two distinct individuals, especially if their progenitors have been subjected to very different conditions, have an immense advantage in height, weight, constitutional vigour and fertility over the self-fertilised offspring from one of the same parents. And this fact is amply sufficient to account for the development of the sexual elements, that is, for the genesis of the two sexes."

In addition, it is thought by some, that a long-term advantage of out-crossing in nature is increased genetic variability that promotes adaptation or avoidance of extinction (see Genetic variability).

== See also ==
- Cell fusion
- Conception cap
- Conception device
- Female sperm
- Fetal development
- In vitro fertilisation
- Kaguya (mouse)
- Parthenogenesis, a type of reproduction that does not involve fertilisation
- Pollination
- Pre-embryo
- Pronucleus
- Superfecundation
- Superfetation
- Symmetry breaking and cortical rotation
- Cortical reaction
- Polyspermy
