= Polyspermy =

Fertilization of an egg by more than one sperm

In biology, polyspermy describes the fertilization of an egg by more than one sperm. Diploid organisms normally contain two copies of each chromosome, one from each parent. The cell resulting from polyspermy, on the other hand, contains three or more copies of each chromosome—one from the egg and one each from multiple sperm. Usually, the result is an unviable zygote. This may occur because sperm are too efficient at reaching and fertilizing eggs due to the selective pressures of sperm competition. Such a situation is often deleterious to the female: in other words, the male–male competition among sperm spills over to create sexual conflict.

== Pathological polyspermy and the blocks ==
In the classical case (at least from the historical human perspective), monospermic fertilization is the norm. For monospermic organisms, polyspermy is a detrimental process where eggs are incorrectly fertilized. It causes the formation of multiple microtubule-organizing centers from multiple, leading to disruption of mitosis, disarrayment in cleavage furrow formation, and ultimately, cell death. As a result, a number of "blocks" have evolved to prevent polyspermy in such organisms.

Polyspermy is very rare in human reproduction. The decline in the numbers of sperm that swim to the oviduct is one of two ways that prevents polyspermy in humans. The other mechanism is the blocking of sperm in the fertilized egg. Only two cases of human polyspermy leading to birth of children have been reported.

=== Fast block of polyspermy ===
The eggs of sexually-reproducing organisms are adapted to avoid this situation. The defenses are particularly well characterized in the sea urchin, which respond to the acceptance of one sperm by inhibiting the successful penetration of the egg by subsequent sperm. Similar defenses exist in other eukaryotes.

The prevention of polyspermy in sea urchins depends on a change in the electrical charge across the surface of the egg, which is caused by the fusion of the first sperm with the egg. Unfertilized sea urchin eggs have a negative charge inside, but the charge becomes positive upon fertilization. When sea urchin sperm encounter an egg with a positive charge, sperm-egg fusion is blocked. Thus, after the first sperm contacts the egg and causes the change, subsequent sperms are prevented from fusing. This "electrical polyspermy block" is thought to result because a positively charged molecule in the sperm surface membrane is repelled by the positive charge at the egg surface.

Electrical polyspermy blocks operate in many animal species, including frogs, clams, and marine worms, but not in the several mammals that have been studied (hamster, rabbit, mouse). In species without an electrical block, polyspermy is usually prevented by secretion of materials that establish a mechanical barrier to polyspermy. Animals such as sea urchins have a two-step polyspermy prevention strategy, with the fast, but transient, electrical block superseded after the first minute or so by a more slowly developing permanent mechanical block. Electrical blocks are helpful in species where a very fast block to polyspermy is needed, due to the presence of many sperm arriving simultaneously at the egg surface, as occurs in animals such as sea urchins. In sea urchins, fertilization occurs externally in the ocean, such that hundreds of sperm can encounter the egg within several seconds.

In mammals, it occurs 2-3 seconds after the first sperm enters the egg. It is a chemical process which involves changing the potential of egg from a resting potential of -70 mv to 10 mv. It involves an influx of sodium ion into the egg. The membrane of the egg changes from negatively to positively charged. Sperm cannot enter a positively charged egg. The positive charge only lasts for 60 seconds.

=== Slow block of polyspermy ===
In mammals, in which fertilization occurs internally, fewer sperm reach the fertilization site in the oviduct. This may be the result of the female genital tract being adapted to minimize the number of sperm reaching the egg. Nevertheless, polyspermy preventing mechanisms are essential in mammals; a secretion reaction, the "cortical reaction" modifies the extracellular coat of the egg (the zona pellucida), and additional mechanisms that are not well understood modify the egg's plasma membrane. The zona pellucida is modified by serine proteases that are released from the cortical granules. The proteases destroy the protein link between the cell membrane and the vitelline envelope, remove any receptors that other sperm have bound to, and help to form the fertilization envelope from the cortical granules.

The cortical reaction occurs due to calcium oscillations inside the oocyte. What triggers such oscillations is PLC-zeta, a phospholipase unique to sperm that is very sensitive to calcium concentrations. When the first spermatozoa get inside the oocyte, it brings in PLC-zeta, that is activated by oocyte's basal calcium concentrations, initiates the formation of IP3 and causes calcium release from endoplasmic reticulum stores, generating the oscillations in calcium concentration that will activate the oocyte and block polyspermy.

== Physiological polyspermy ==
Physiological polyspermy happens when the egg normally accepts more than one sperm but only one of the multiple sperm will fuse its nucleus with the nucleus of the egg. Physiological polyspermy is present in some species of vertebrates and invertebrates. Some species utilize physiological polyspermy as the proper mechanism for developing their offspring. Some of these animals include birds, ctenophora, reptiles and amphibians. Some vertebrates that are both amniote or anamniote, including urodele amphibians, cartilaginous fish, birds and reptiles, undergo physiological polyspermy because of the internal fertilization of their yolky eggs. Sperm triggers egg activation by the induction of free calcium ion concentration in the cytoplasm of the egg. This induction plays a very critical role in both physiological polyspermy and monomeric polyspermy species. The rise in calcium causes activation of the egg. The egg will then be altered on both a biochemical and morphological level. In mammals as well as sea urchins, the sudden rise in calcium concentration occurs because of the influx of calcium ions within the egg. These calcium ions are responsible for the cortical granule reaction, and are also stored in the egg's endoplasmic reticulum.

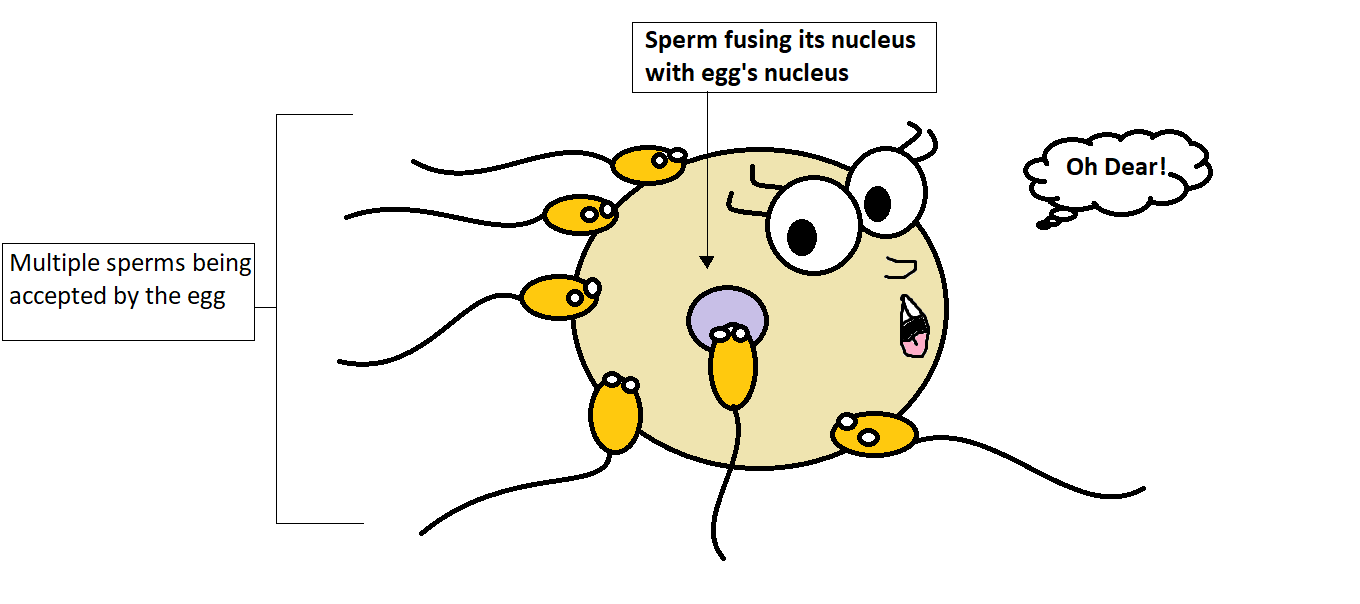
During physiological polyspermy, the egg accepts multiple sperms but only allows one sperm to fuse its nucleus with the egg's nucleus.

Unlike physiological polyspermy, monospermic fertilization (described above) deals with the analysis of the egg calcium waves, as this is the typical reproduction process in all species. Species that undergo physiological polyspermy have polyploidy-preventing mechanisms that act inside the egg. This is quite different from the normal polyspermy block on the outside of the egg. Even though multiple sperm enter the cell and each form an aster (see: Fertilisation § The sperm aster and zygote centrosomes), only one male pronucleus is chosen to merge with the female pronucleus.

In amphibians, the sperm pronucleus needs to be in the animal hemisphere to be chosen. It's also known that the chosen pronucleus also has the biggest aster, though details on how this is achieved (and how precisely it affects choice) remains unknown. The addition pronuclei are degraded during cleavage. In birds, the chosen pronucleus moves to the center of the germinal disk, while the others move to the periphery.

=== Chicken and zebra finch eggs require multiple sperm ===
In the journal Proceedings of the Royal Society B, as reported in the New York Times, Dr. Nicola Hemmings, an evolutionary biologist at the University of Sheffield, and one of the study's authors reported that the eggs of zebra finches and chickens require multiple sperm, from 10 to hundreds of sperm, to penetrate the egg to ensure successful fertilization and growth of the bird embryo.

== Compensable polyspermy ==
Yet another case involves normally monospermic organisms that "tolerate" polyspermy without ill effects. In other words, they too can choose one sperm pronucleus to fuse with, discarding the rest. A number of species is known to exhibit this unusual behavior, but this case is very poorly studied.

== Evolutionary view ==
Pathological polyspermy is costly for females as it decreases their chances to produce offspring. This would make investing into defenses that block polyspermy viable. Female defenses select for ever more aggressive male sperm, however, leading to an evolutionary arms race. On the one hand, polyspermy creates inviable zygotes and lowers female fitness, but on the other, defenses may prevent fertilization altogether. This leads to a delicate compromise between the two, and has been suggested as one possible cause for the relatively high infertility rates seen in mammalian species.

The existence of compensable polyspermy suggests an alternative solution: females could also evolve tolerance of polyspermy to reduce its costs.

== See also ==
- Cortical reaction
