= Zona pellucida-like domain =

Identifiers
- Symbol: Zona_pellucida
- Pfam: PF00100
- InterPro: IPR001507
- SMART: SM00241
- PROSITE: PDOC00577
- Membranome: 146
Available protein structures:
- PDB: IPR001507 PF00100 (ECOD; PDBsum)
- AlphaFold: IPR001507; PF00100

The zona pellucida-like domain (ZP domain / ZP-like domain / ZP module) is a large protein region of about 260 amino acids. It has been recognised in a variety of receptor-like eukaryotic glycoproteins. All of these molecules are mosaic proteins with a large extracellular region composed of various domains, often followed by either a transmembrane domain and a short cytoplasmic region or by a GPI-anchor.

Functional and crystallographic studies revealed that the "ZP domain" region common to all these proteins is a protein polymerization module that consists of two distinct but structurally related immunoglobulin-like domains, ZP-N and ZP-C, separated by an interdomain linker (ITD). The ZP module is located in the C-terminal portion of the extracellular region and – with the exception of non-polymeric family member ENG – contains 8 or 10 conserved Cys residues involved in disulfide bonds. The ZP-C domain contains a EHP/IHP motif that controls polymerization.

The first 3D structure of a homopolymeric ZP module protein filament, native human uromodulin (UMOD), was determined by cryo-EM.

Additional copies of isolated ZP-N domains are found in the N-terminal region of egg coat protein subunits involved in fertilization in both vertebrates and invertebrates, with the human zona pellucida components ZP1, ZP2 and ZP4 being the best understood. The mollusc "vitelline envelope receptor for egg lysin" (VERL, Q8WR62) is found in the vitelline envelope of mollusc eggs and consists of 22 VERL repeats followed by a ZP module. Structural work from 2017 demonstrated that VERL repeats are also ZP-N domains.

== Examples ==
Human genes encoding proteins containing this domain include:

- CUZD1
- DMBT1
- ENG
- GP2
- OIT3
- POMZP3
- TECTA, TECTB, TGFBR3
- UMOD, UMODL1
- ZP1, ZP2, ZP3, ZP4, ZPLD1
