= ZP2 =

Protein-coding gene in the species Homo sapiens

Identifiers
- Aliases: ZP2, ZPA, Zp-2, zona pellucida glycoprotein 2, OOMD6
- External IDs: OMIM: 182888; MGI: 99214; GeneCards: ZP2

Gene location (Human)
Chr.	Chromosome 16 (human)
Band	16p12.3-p12.2	Start	21,197,450 bp
Band	16p12.3-p12.2	End	21,214,510 bp

Gene location (Mouse)
Chr.	Chromosome 7 (mouse)
Band	7 F2|7 64.38 cM	Start	119,725,995 bp
Band	7 F2|7 64.38 cM	End	119,744,514 bp
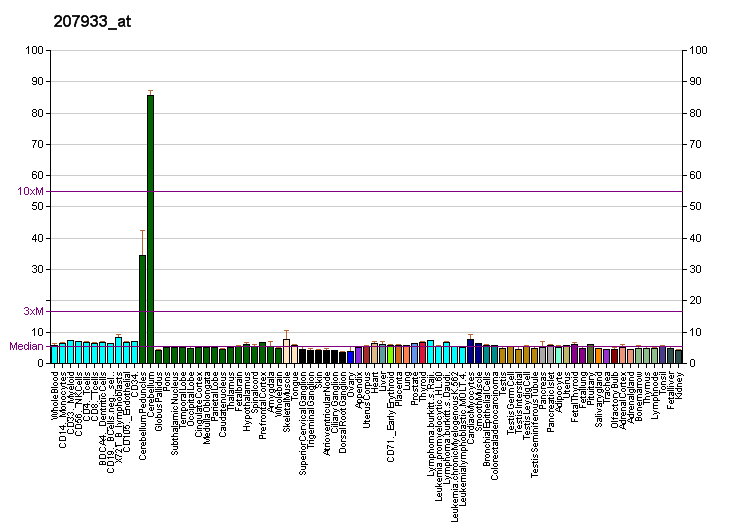
RNA expression pattern
Bgee	Human / Mouse (ortholog); Top expressed in: cerebellar cortex; cerebellar hemisphere; right hemisphere of cerebellum; testicle; placenta; mucosa of large intestine; gallbladder; mucosa of transverse colon; duodenum; C1 segment / Top expressed in: blastocyst; primary oocyte; zygote; secondary oocyte; embryo; morula; ovary; muscle of thigh; epiblast; soleus muscle; More reference expression data
BioGPS	More reference expression data
Gene ontology
Molecular function	acrosin binding; coreceptor activity; identical protein binding; protein binding
Cellular component	extracellular matrix; integral component of membrane; extracellular region; multivesicular body; plasma membrane; endoplasmic reticulum; membrane; collagen-containing extracellular matrix
Biological process	regulation of acrosome reaction; prevention of polyspermy; binding of sperm to zona pellucida; single fertilization; signal transduction
Sources:Amigo / QuickGO
Orthologs
Databases	NCBI: entry; OMA: entry
Species	Human	Mouse
Entrez	7783	22787
Ensembl	ENSG00000284588; ENSG00000103310	ENSMUSG00000030911
UniProt	Q05996	P20239
RefSeq (mRNA)	NM_001290104; NM_003460; NM_001376231; NM_001376232; NM_001376233	NM_011775; NM_001374631
RefSeq (protein)	NP_003451; NP_001363160; NP_001363161; NP_001363162	NP_035905; NP_001361560
Location (UCSC)	Chr 16: 21.2 – 21.21 Mb	Chr 7: 119.73 – 119.74 Mb
PubMed search
- Wikidata
View/Edit Human	View/Edit Mouse

Zona pellucida sperm-binding protein 2 is a protein that in humans is encoded by the ZP2 gene.

== Function ==
The zona pellucida is an extracellular matrix that surrounds the oocyte and early embryo. It is composed primarily of three (mouse) or four (human) glycoproteins (ZP1-4) with various functions during fertilization and preimplantation development. The protein encoded by this gene is a structural component of the zona pellucida and functions in secondary binding and penetration of acrosome-reacted spermatozoa. The nascent protein contains a N-terminal signal peptide sequence, a conserved ZP domain, a consensus furin cleavage site, and a C-terminal transmembrane domain. It is hypothesized that furin cleavage results in release of the mature protein from the plasma membrane for subsequent incorporation into the zona pellucida matrix. However, the requirement for furin cleavage in this process remains controversial based on mouse studies.

The sperm-binding domain on the ZP2 protein is necessary in both humans and mice for oocyte-sperm recognition and penetration of the zona pellucida. It is also responsible for the primary block to polyspermy in mammals. The oocyte has cortical granules peripherally located under the cortex that contain a proteolytic protein called ovastacin. After the sperm binds to ZP2, the cortical granules are exocytosed releasing ovastacin into the perivitelline space. Ovastacin cleaves ZP2 at the N terminus, preventing more sperm from binding and penetrating the oocyte, thus hardening the zona pellucida. Ovastacin is only found in oocytes, and is part of the astacin family of metalloendoproteases. Female mice engineered without ovastacin showed that ZP2 was not cleaved after fertilization.

== 3D structure ==
The crystal structure of the sperm-binding domain of ZP2 at 0.95 Å resolution (PDB: 5II6) showed that is shares the same ZP-N fold first identified in structures of ZP3 (PDB: 3D4C, 3D4G, 3EF7, 3NK3, 3NK4). This provided experimental evidence for the suggestion that the N-terminal region of ZP2 consists of three ZP-N repeats and revealed that - despite insignificant sequence identity - ZP2 is structurally similar to VERL, the vitelline envelope receptor for egg lysin of the mollusk abalone (PDB: 5II4, 5II5, 5MR2, 5IIC, 5IIA, 5IIB, 5MR3). This established a link between invertebrate and vertebrate fertilization by suggesting that, despite being separated by 600 million years of evolution, mollusk and human use a common protein fold to interact with sperm.
