= SOHLH1 =

Protein-coding gene in humans

Identifiers
- Aliases: SOHLH1, C9orf157, NOHLH, SPATA27, TEB2, bA100C15.3, bHLHe80, spermatogenesis and oogenesis specific basic helix-loop-helix 1, ODG5, SPGF32
- External IDs: OMIM: 610224; MGI: 2684956; GeneCards: SOHLH1

Gene location (Human)
Chr.	Chromosome 9 (human)
Band	9q34.3	Start	135,693,407 bp
Band	9q34.3	End	135,704,498 bp

Gene location (Mouse)
Chr.	Chromosome 2 (mouse)
Band	2|2 A3	Start	25,733,007 bp
Band	2|2 A3	End	25,737,260 bp
RNA expression pattern
Bgee	Human / Mouse (ortholog); Top expressed in: right frontal lobe; gonad; anterior cingulate cortex; Brodmann area 9; prefrontal cortex; right testis; left testis; testicle; primary visual cortex; amygdala / Top expressed in: embryo; Gonadal ridge; cumulus cell; lens; ovary; testicle; spermatid; fibula; tibia; gastrula; More reference expression data
BioGPS	n/a
Gene ontology
Molecular function	DNA binding; core promoter sequence-specific DNA binding; protein dimerization activity; DNA-binding transcription activator activity, RNA polymerase II-specific; protein homodimerization activity; protein heterodimerization activity; DNA-binding transcription factor activity, RNA polymerase II-specific
Cellular component	cytoplasm; nucleus
Biological process	multicellular organism development; regulation of transcription, DNA-templated; positive regulation of transcription by RNA polymerase II; transcription, DNA-templated; oogenesis; transcription by RNA polymerase II; regulation of transcription by RNA polymerase II; spermatogenesis; oocyte differentiation; cell differentiation
Sources:Amigo / QuickGO
Orthologs
Databases	NCBI: entry; OMA: entry
Species	Human	Mouse
Entrez	402381	227631
Ensembl	ENSG00000165643	ENSMUSG00000059625
UniProt	Q5JUK2	Q6IUP1
RefSeq (mRNA)	NM_001012415; NM_001101677	NM_001001714
RefSeq (protein)	NP_001012415; NP_001095147	NP_001001714
Location (UCSC)	Chr 9: 135.69 – 135.7 Mb	Chr 2: 25.73 – 25.74 Mb
PubMed search
- Wikidata
View/Edit Human	View/Edit Mouse

Spermatogenesis- and oogenesis-specific basic helix-loop-helix-containing protein 1 is a protein which in humans is encoded by the gene SOHLH1. It functions as a transcription factor, which means it binds with DNA and helps regulate which genes get translated into RNA and eventually encoded into proteins. SOHLH1, in particular, is involved in the differentiation and production of both sperm cells (spermatogenesis) and egg cells (oogenesis). Beyond these two kinds of germ cells, it is also expressed in ovarian follicles, which help support and mature oocytes (immature egg cells). Mutations which interfere with the functioning of the SOHLH1 gene in humans are associated with infertility and other reproductive system conditions.

== Function ==
As its name suggests, SOHLH1 is a transcription factor of the basic helix–loop–helix family. It is involved in the development of both ovaries and testes. In the reproductive system, SOHLH1 (together with its homolog SOHLH2) are predominantly expressed in germ cells and early ovarian follicles (primordial and primary). Follicles fail to develop properly in the ovaries of knock-out mice, and are completely missing by 3 weeks after birth. These defects are thought to be related to SOHLH1’s regulation of genes specific to germ cells, notably including the transcription factor LHX8 which it directly regulates. Other directly regulated genes include ZP1 and ZP3.

== Clinical significance ==
Pathogenic variants in human are associated with both male and female reproductive system dysfunction. In the female reproductive system, homozygous variants have been associated with a failure of the ovaries to develop normally. Instead, the gonads develop into non-functional fibrous tissue (a condition called gonadal dysgenesis). The specific subtype associated with SOHLH1 is called Ovarian Dysgenesis 5. In the male reproductive system, heterozygous variants are associated with infertility due to a failure in sperm production, which is called nonobstructive azoospermia. This SOHLH1-associated subtype is called Spermatogenic Failure 32.
