= GDF2 =

Protein-coding gene in the species Homo sapiens

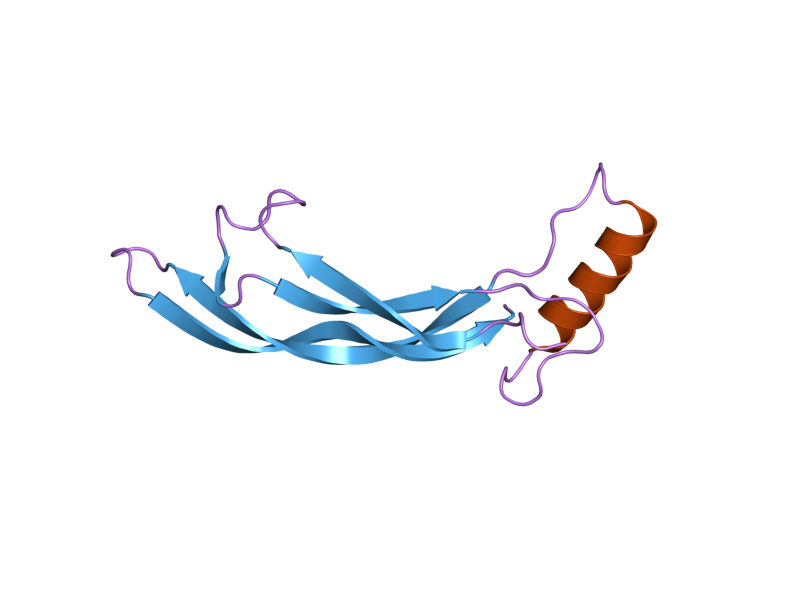

Identifiers
- Aliases: GDF2, BMP-9, BMP9, HHT5, growth differentiation factor 2
- External IDs: OMIM: 605120; MGI: 1321394; GeneCards: GDF2
Available structures
PDB	Ortholog search: PDBe RCSB
PDB	List of PDB id codes 1ZKZ, 4FAO, 4MPL, 4YCG, 4YCI

Gene location (Human)
Chr.	Chromosome 10 (human)
Band	10q11.22	Start	47,322,454 bp
Band	10q11.22	End	47,327,588 bp

Gene location (Mouse)
Chr.	Chromosome 14 (mouse)
Band	14|14 B	Start	33,662,996 bp
Band	14|14 B	End	33,669,155 bp
RNA expression pattern
Bgee	Human / Mouse (ortholog); Top expressed in: testicle; right lobe of liver; placenta; atrium; right atrium; right auricle of heart; haematopoietic system; hypothalamus; ventricle of the heart; left ventricle / Top expressed in: hepatobiliary system; liver; fetal liver hematopoietic progenitor cell; embryo; left lobe of liver; autopod region; atrioventricular junction; mesenteric lymph nodes; abdominal wall; calvaria; More reference expression data
BioGPS	n/a
Gene ontology
Molecular function	cytokine activity; protein binding; transforming growth factor beta receptor binding; growth factor activity
Cellular component	extracellular exosome; extracellular space; extracellular region
Biological process	regulation of apoptotic process; pathway-restricted SMAD protein phosphorylation; positive regulation of endothelial cell differentiation; regulation of MAPK cascade; positive regulation of endothelial cell proliferation; blood vessel morphogenesis; negative regulation of blood vessel endothelial cell migration; cell development; SMAD protein signal transduction; ossification; positive regulation of pathway-restricted SMAD protein phosphorylation; cellular response to BMP stimulus; negative regulation of DNA replication; positive regulation of angiogenesis; negative regulation of endothelial cell migration; negative regulation of endothelial cell proliferation; vasculogenesis; positive regulation of transcription, DNA-templated; cartilage development; positive regulation of gene expression; positive regulation of osteoblast differentiation; positive regulation of cartilage development; negative regulation of cell growth; angiogenesis; osteoblast differentiation; positive regulation of interleukin-8 production; positive regulation of BMP signaling pathway; branching involved in blood vessel morphogenesis; negative regulation of angiogenesis; negative regulation of DNA biosynthetic process; positive regulation of transcription by RNA polymerase II; cellular iron ion homeostasis; activin receptor signaling pathway; BMP signaling pathway; regulation of signaling receptor activity
Sources:Amigo / QuickGO
Orthologs
Databases	NCBI: entry; OMA: entry
Species	Human	Mouse
Entrez	2658	12165
Ensembl	ENSG00000263761	ENSMUSG00000072625
UniProt	Q9UK05	Q9WV56
RefSeq (mRNA)	NM_016204	NM_019506
RefSeq (protein)	NP_057288	NP_062379
Location (UCSC)	Chr 10: 47.32 – 47.33 Mb	Chr 14: 33.66 – 33.67 Mb
PubMed search
- Wikidata
View/Edit Human	View/Edit Mouse

Growth differentiation factor 2 (GDF2) also known as bone morphogenetic protein (BMP)-9 is a protein that in humans is encoded by the GDF2 gene. GDF2 belongs to the transforming growth factor beta superfamily.

== Structure ==
GDF2 contains an N-terminal TGF-beta-like pro-peptide (prodomain) (residues 56–257) and a C-terminal transforming growth factor beta superfamily domain (325–428). GDF2 (BMP9) is secreted as a pro-complex consisting of the BMP9 growth factor dimer non-covalently bound to two BMP9 prodomain molecules in an open-armed conformation.

== Function ==
GDF2 has a role in inducing and maintaining the ability of embryonic basal forebrain cholinergic neurons (BFCN) to respond to a neurotransmitter called acetylcholine; BFCN are important for the processes of learning, memory and attention. GDF2 is also important for the maturation of BFCN. Another role of GDF2 has been recently suggested. GDF2 is a potent inducer of hepcidin (a cationic peptide that has antimicrobial properties) in liver cells (hepatocytes) and can regulate iron metabolism. The physiological receptor of GDF2 is activin receptor-like kinase 1, ALK1 (also called ACVRL1), an endothelial-specific type I receptor of the TGF-beta receptor family. Endoglin, a type I membrane glycoprotein that forms the TGF-beta receptor complex, is a co-receptor of ALK1 for GDF2/BMP-9 binding. Mutations in ALK1 and endoglin cause hereditary hemorrhagic telangiectasia (HHT), a rare but life-threatening genetic disorder that leads to abnormal blood vessel formation in multiple tissues and organs of the body.

GDF2 is one of the most potent BMPs to induce orthotopic bone formation in vivo. BMP3, a blocker of most BMPs seems not to affect GDF2.

GDF2 induces the differentiation of mesenchymal stem cells (MSCs) to an osteoblast lineage. The Smad signaling pathway of GDF2 target HEY1 inducing the differentiation by up regulating it. Augmented expression of HEY1 increase the mineralization of the cells. RUNX2 is another factor who's up regulate by GDF2. This factor is known to be essential for osteoblastic differentiation.

== Interactions ==
The signaling complex for bone morphogenetic proteins (BMP) start with a ligand binding with a high affinity type I receptor (ALK1-7) followed by the recruitment of a type II receptor(ActRIIA, ActRIIB, BMPRII). The first receptor kinase domain is then trans-phosphorylated by the apposed, activating type II receptor kinase domain. GDF2 binds ALK1 and ActRIIB with the highest affinity in the BMPs, it also binds, with a lower affinity ALK2, also known has Activin A receptor, type I (ACVR1), and the other type II receptors BMPRII and ActRIIA. GDF2 and BMP10 are the only ligands from the TGF-β superfamily that can bind to both type I and II receptors with equally high affinity. This non-discriminative formation of the signaling complex open the possibility of a new mechanism. In cell type with low expression level of ActRIIB, GDF2 might still signal due to its affinity to ALK1, then form complex with type II receptors.

== Associated diseases ==
Mutations in GDF2 gene have been identified in patients with vascular disorders that phenotypically overlap predominantly with pulmonary arterial hypertension (PAH), and occasionally with congenital heart diseases and more rarely with hereditary hemorrhagic telangiectasia. Pathogenic variants in GDF2 were identified in 1.3% of patients PAH. In this series, PAH onset occurred at a median age of 30 years and showed a female predominance. Congenital heart disease was present in 15.4% of cases and hemoptysis appeared to be more frequent than typically observed in other forms of PAH. Most patients exhibited severe functional impairment and marked haemodynamic compromise.

== Signaling ==
Like other BMPs, GDF2 binding to its receptors triggers the phosphorylation of the R-Smads, Smad1,5,8. The activation of this pathway has been documented in all cellular types analyzed up to date, including hepatocytes and HCC cells. GDF2 also triggers Smad-2/Smad-3 phosphorylation in different endothelial cell types.

Another pathway for GDF2 is the induced non-canonical one. Little is known about this type of pathway in GDF2. GDF2 activate JNK in osteogenic differentiation of mesenchymal progenitor cells (MPCs). GDF2 also triggers p38 and ERK activation who will modulate de Smad pathway, p38 increase the phosphorylation of Smad 1,5,8 by GDF2 whereas ERK has the opposite effect.

The transcriptional factor p38 activation induced by GDF2 has been documented in other cell types such as osteosarcoma cells, human osteoclasts derived from cord blood monocytes, and dental follicle stem cells.
