= LRG1 =

Protein-coding gene in the species Homo sapiens

Identifiers
- Aliases: LRG1, HMFT1766, LRG, leucine-rich alpha-2-glycoprotein 1, leucine rich alpha-2-glycoprotein 1, LGR-1
- External IDs: OMIM: 611289; MGI: 1924155; HomoloGene: 36468; GeneCards: LRG1; OMA:LRG1 - orthologs

Gene location (Human)
Chr.	Chromosome 19 (human)
Band	19p13.3	Start	4,536,402 bp
Band	19p13.3	End	4,540,036 bp

Gene location (Mouse)
Chr.	Chromosome 17 (mouse)
Band	17 29.17 cM|17 D	Start	56,426,678 bp
Band	17 29.17 cM|17 D	End	56,429,001 bp
RNA expression pattern
Bgee	Human / Mouse (ortholog); Top expressed in: right lobe of liver; pancreatic ductal cell; olfactory zone of nasal mucosa; nasal epithelium; blood; body of pancreas; palpebral conjunctiva; bone marrow; gallbladder; appendix / Top expressed in: granulocyte; left lobe of liver; white adipose tissue; lactiferous gland; brown adipose tissue; subcutaneous adipose tissue; ankle joint; tibiofemoral joint; mesenteric lymph nodes; ankle; More reference expression data
BioGPS	n/a
Gene ontology
Molecular function	transforming growth factor beta receptor binding; protein binding; molecular function
Cellular component	extracellular exosome; membrane; extracellular space; specific granule lumen; intracellular membrane-bounded organelle; tertiary granule lumen; ficolin-1-rich granule lumen; extracellular region
Biological process	positive regulation of transforming growth factor beta receptor signaling pathway; positive regulation of endothelial cell proliferation; positive regulation of angiogenesis; brown fat cell differentiation; neutrophil degranulation; biological process; response to bacterium
Sources:Amigo / QuickGO
Orthologs
Species	Human	Mouse
Entrez	116844	76905
Ensembl	ENSG00000171236	ENSMUSG00000037095
UniProt	P02750	Q91XL1
RefSeq (mRNA)	NM_052972	NM_029796
RefSeq (protein)	NP_443204	NP_084072
Location (UCSC)	Chr 19: 4.54 – 4.54 Mb	Chr 17: 56.43 – 56.43 Mb
PubMed search
- Wikidata
View/Edit Human	View/Edit Mouse

Leucine-rich alpha-2-glycoprotein 1 is a protein which in humans is encoded by the gene LRG1.

== Function ==
The leucine-rich repeat (LRR) family of proteins, including LRG1, have been shown to be involved in protein-protein interaction, signal transduction, and cell adhesion and development. LRG1 is expressed during granulocyte differentiation.

LRG1 has been shown to be involved in promoting neovascularization (new blood vessel growth) through causing a switch in transforming growth factor beta (TGFbeta) signaling in endothelial cells. LRG1 binds to the accessory receptor endoglin and promotes signaling via the ALK1-Smad1/5/8 pathway.

== Application ==
Levels of the LRG protein are markedly elevated in acute appendicitis and therefore could be used as a diagnostic aid.

LRG1 may be a potential therapeutic target for the treatment of diseases where there is aberrant neovascularization.

Circulating LRG1 levels are increased in many cancer patients and may be a useful biomarker. Inhibition of LRG1 normalises the tumor vasculature, improves the efficacy of cytotoxic and immune therapies, and restricts metastatic spread.

LRG1 has been implicated in the pathogenesis of numerous diseases including cancer, eye disease, neurodegenerative disease, diabetes, lung and kidney disease
