= Lysin (disambiguation) =

The term lysin may refer to any protein that causes cell lysis, such as:

- Most commonly, phage lysins, also known as endolysins
- Autolysin
- Cytolysin
- Egg lysin
- Hemolysin
- NK-lysin
- Streptolysin

== See also ==
- Cell lysis
- Toxin
