= ZP1 =

Protein-coding gene in the species Homo sapiens

Identifiers
- Aliases: ZP1, HEL163, OOMD, OOMD1, zona pellucida glycoprotein 1, ZPB1
- External IDs: OMIM: 195000; MGI: 103073; GeneCards: ZP1

Gene location (Human)
Chr.	Chromosome 11 (human)
Band	11q12.2	Start	60,867,542 bp
Band	11q12.2	End	60,875,693 bp

Gene location (Mouse)
Chr.	Chromosome 19 (mouse)
Band	19 A|19 7.36 cM	Start	10,891,651 bp
Band	19 A|19 7.36 cM	End	10,897,996 bp
RNA expression pattern
Bgee	Human / Mouse (ortholog); Top expressed in: oocyte; testicle; secondary oocyte; pituitary gland; anterior pituitary; left testis; right testis; gonad; cerebellar hemisphere; right hemisphere of cerebellum / Top expressed in: primary oocyte; secondary oocyte; zygote; egg cell; morula; embryo; ovary; lumbar subsegment of spinal cord; blastocyst; spinal ganglia; More reference expression data
BioGPS	n/a
Gene ontology
Molecular function	protein binding
Cellular component	extracellular matrix; integral component of membrane; extracellular region; plasma membrane; membrane; collagen-containing extracellular matrix
Biological process	binding of sperm to zona pellucida; single fertilization
Sources:Amigo / QuickGO
Orthologs
Databases	NCBI: entry; OMA: entry
Species	Human	Mouse
Entrez	22917	22786
Ensembl	ENSG00000149506	ENSMUSG00000024734
UniProt	P60852	Q62005
RefSeq (mRNA)	NM_207341; NM_001391943; NM_001391944	NM_009580
RefSeq (protein)	NP_997224	NP_033606
Location (UCSC)	Chr 11: 60.87 – 60.88 Mb	Chr 19: 10.89 – 10.9 Mb
PubMed search
- Wikidata
View/Edit Human	View/Edit Mouse

Zona pellucida sperm-binding protein 1 is a protein that in humans is encoded by the gene ZP1. The ZP1 protein, together with the related proteins ZP2, ZP3, and ZP4, forms an envelope around oocytes called the zona pellucida. The zona pellucida binds to sperm and functions as a “gatekeeper”, preventing an oocyte from being fertilized by multiple sperm or sperm from different species. Certain pathogenic mutations in ZP1 have been associated with a lack of zona pellucida around oocytes, leading to a type of infertility sometimes called Oocyte/zygote/embryo Maturation Arrest 1 (OZEMA1).

Understanding of the function of ZP1 in humans has been limited by the fact that, unlike its ortholog in the commonly studied mouse model, human ZP1 appears capable of binding to human sperm. The ortholog of ZP4 in mice is also a noncoding pseudogene, further complicating attempts to extrapolate mouse research on ZP proteins to human ZP proteins.
