= Coiled-coil domain-containing protein 169 =

CCDC169

Identifiers
- Aliases: CCDC169, C13orf38, coiled-coil domain containing 169
- External IDs: MGI: 2444356; GeneCards: CCDC169

Gene location (Human)
Chr.	Chromosome 13 (human)
Band	13q13.3	Start	36,222,008 bp
Band	13q13.3	End	36,297,840 bp

Gene location (Mouse)
Chr.	Chromosome 3 (mouse)
Band	3|3 C	Start	55,044,760 bp
Band	3|3 C	End	55,080,356 bp
RNA expression pattern
Bgee	Human / Mouse (ortholog); Top expressed in: sperm; left testis; right testis; testicle; gonad; stromal cell of endometrium; smooth muscle tissue; muscle layer of sigmoid colon; prefrontal cortex; muscle of thigh / Top expressed in: spermatid; lumbar subsegment of spinal cord; morula; embryo; spermatocyte; neural layer of retina; testicle; zygote; seminiferous tubule; islet of Langerhans; More reference expression data
BioGPS	n/a
Orthologs
Databases	NCBI: entry; OMA: entry
Species	Human	Mouse
Entrez	728591	320604
Ensembl	ENSG00000242715	ENSMUSG00000048655
UniProt	A6NNP5	Q8BXX9
RefSeq (mRNA)	NM_001198908; NM_001144981; NM_001144982; NM_001144983; NM_001144984 NM_001144985; NM_001144986	NM_001290138; NM_001290141; NM_177203
RefSeq (protein)	NP_001138453; NP_001138454; NP_001138455; NP_001138456; NP_001138457 NP_001138458; NP_001185837	NP_001277067; NP_001277070; NP_796177
Location (UCSC)	Chr 13: 36.22 – 36.3 Mb	Chr 3: 55.04 – 55.08 Mb
PubMed search
- Wikidata
View/Edit Human	View/Edit Mouse

Coiled-coil domain-containing protein 169 is a protein which in humans is encoded by the gene CCDC169 (previously C13orf38). The CCDC169 protein is 139 amino acids long. The protein is found to be over expressed in the testis of humans.

== Alternative Splicing ==
CCDC169 has seven isoforms, a through e. This gene may form a fusion gene with SOHLH2 called CCDC169-SOHLH2 which encodes a protein called CCDC169-SOHLH2 Protein.

== Protein regulation ==
There is evidence that the protein is retained in the nucleus. There are several leucine-rich nuclear export signals in the amino acid sequence of the protein. Making it likely to be retained in the nucleus after transcription.

== Gene expression ==
=== Tissue expression ===
C13orf38 is over expressed in the testis of humans. It has very weak expression data in the bone marrow, brain, and vascular tissues. It is expressed in several types of tumors – brain, lung, and germ cell tumors. It can also be expressed in leukemia cells.

== Homologs and paralogs ==
Homologs were found mostly in primates. The homolog with the furthest divergence would be the Hood coral, which predates humans by 686 million years.

There are two low identity paralogs and two hypothetical protein paralogs found through the sequencing of the human genome.

=== Genetic divergence ===
Diverges 432 million years ago from Zebra fish. The most divergent species would be the Hood coral, Stylophora pistillata, at 686 million years ago.

== Interacting proteins ==
Protein	annotation	score
AGPAT1	1-acyl-sn-glycerol-3-phosphate acyltransferase alpha; Converts lysophosphatidic acid (LPA) into phosphatidic acid by incorporating an acyl moiety at the sn-2 position of the glycerol backbone; 1-acylglycerol-3-phosphate O-acyltransferases	0.471
BAIAP3	BAI1 associated protein 3; C2 domain containing	0.708
CLMP	CXADR-like membrane protein; May be involved in the cell-cell adhesion. May play a role in adipocyte differentiation and development of obesity. Is required for normal small intestine development; I-set domain containing	0.526
GABRQ	Gamma-aminobutyric acid receptor subunit theta; GABA, the major inhibitory neurotransmitter in the vertebrate brain, mediates neuronal inhibition by binding to the GABA/benzodiazepine receptor and opening an integral chloride channel; Gamma-aminobutyric acid type A receptor subunits	0.695
KCNK12	Potassium channel subfamily K member 12; Probable potassium channel subunit. No channel activity observed in heterologous systems. May need to associate with another protein to form a functional channel (By similarity); Potassium two pore domain channel subfamily K	0.677
NEMF	Nuclear export mediator factor NEMF; Component of the ribosome quality control complex (RQC), a ribosome-associated complex that mediates ubiquitination and extraction of incompletely synthesized nascent chains for proteasomal degradation. NEMF is responsible for selective recognition of stalled 60S subunits by recognizing an exposed, nascent chain-conjugated tRNA moiety. NEMF is important for the stable association of LTN1 to the complex. May indirectly play a role in nuclear export	0.572
TRIM68	E3 ubiquitin-protein ligase TRIM68; Functions as a ubiquitin E3 ligase. Acts as a coactivator of androgen receptor (AR) depending on its ubiquitin ligase activity; Ring finger proteins	0.559
VAV3	Guanine nucleotide exchange factor VAV3; Exchange factor for GTP-binding proteins RhoA, RhoG and, to a lesser extent, Rac1. Binds physically to the nucleotide-free states of those GTPases. Plays an important role in angiogenesis. Its recruitment by phosphorylated EPHA2 is critical for EFNA1- induced RAC1 GTPase activation and vascular endothelial cell migration and assembly (By similarity). May be important for integrin-mediated signaling, at least in some cell types. In osteoclasts, along with SYK tyrosine kinase, required for signaling through integrin alpha-v/beta-1 (ITAGV-ITGB1), a [...]	0.522
WBSCR17	Polypeptide N-acetylgalactosaminyltransferase 17; May catalyze the initial reaction in O-linked oligosaccharide biosynthesis, the transfer of an N-acetyl-D- galactosamine residue to a serine or threonine residue on the protein receptor	0.685
ZNF562	Zinc finger protein 562; May be involved in transcriptional regulation; Zinc fingers C2H2-type	0.658

== Experimental data ==
Cdcc169 has been used in a variety of tissue expression experiments. One study was done on a variety of tissues in order to show that gene expression in the mid-range of tissue expression can give a strong clue to the function of a gene. The study covered and analyzed set of 62,839 probe sets in 12 representative normal human tissues. 0 represents housekeeping genes and 1 is for tissue specific genes. CCDC 169 was found not to have housekeeping gene type expression. It was tissue specific and appeared in the prostate.

A systematic survey of gene expression in 115 human tissue samples representing 35 different tissue types. The study used cDNA micro-arrays representing approximately 26,000 different human genes. The study included Ccdc169, which showed a strong positive expression in the testes. This study goal was to find a baseline which could be used to help identify diseased tissue and look at genes with tissue specific expression and how those can be used as markers for detecting diseased and injured tissue in organs. Could be used in anticancer therapy.
