= SPA17 =

Protein-coding gene in the species Homo sapiens

Identifiers
- Aliases: SPA17, CT22, SP17, SP17-1, sperm autoantigenic protein 17
- External IDs: OMIM: 608621; MGI: 1333778; HomoloGene: 7951; GeneCards: SPA17; OMA:SPA17 - orthologs

Gene location (Human)
Chr.	Chromosome 11 (human)
Band	11q24.2	Start	124,673,844 bp
Band	11q24.2	End	124,697,518 bp

Gene location (Mouse)
Chr.	Chromosome 9 (mouse)
Band	9|9 A4	Start	37,514,586 bp
Band	9|9 A4	End	37,525,018 bp
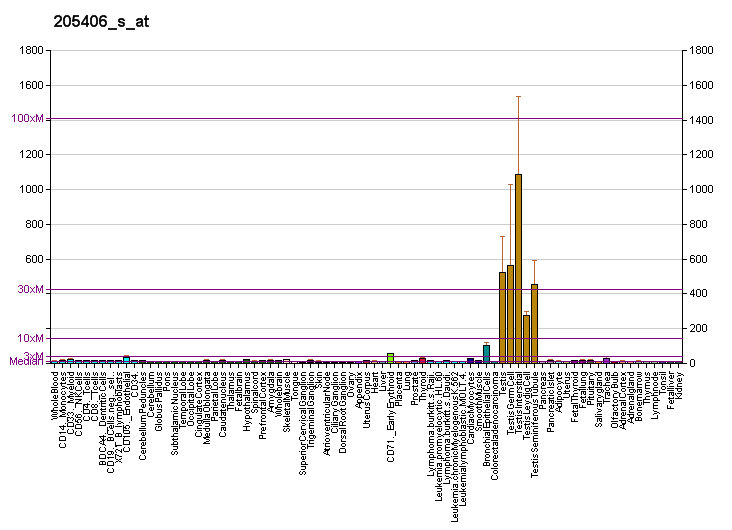
RNA expression pattern
Bgee	Human / Mouse (ortholog); Top expressed in: bronchial epithelial cell; sperm; left testis; right testis; olfactory zone of nasal mucosa; mucosa of paranasal sinus; right uterine tube; caput epididymis; Epithelium of choroid plexus; epithelium of nasopharynx / Top expressed in: seminiferous tubule; spermatid; olfactory epithelium; spermatocyte; choroidal fissure; right kidney; lumbar spinal ganglion; right lung lobe; ventricular zone; islet of Langerhans; More reference expression data
BioGPS	More reference expression data
Gene ontology
Molecular function	protein binding; calmodulin binding
Cellular component	cytoplasm; sperm principal piece; motile cilium; sperm fibrous sheath; external side of plasma membrane; membrane; cilium; extracellular region
Biological process	epithelial cilium movement involved in extracellular fluid movement; spermatogenesis; single fertilization; binding of sperm to zona pellucida
Sources:Amigo / QuickGO
Orthologs
Species	Human	Mouse
Entrez	53340	20686
Ensembl	ENSG00000064199	ENSMUSG00000001948
UniProt	Q15506	Q62252
RefSeq (mRNA)	NM_017425	NM_011449; NM_001324545
RefSeq (protein)	NP_059121	NP_001311474; NP_035579
Location (UCSC)	Chr 11: 124.67 – 124.7 Mb	Chr 9: 37.51 – 37.53 Mb
PubMed search
- Wikidata
View/Edit Human	View/Edit Mouse

Sperm surface protein Sp17 is a protein that in humans is encoded by the SPA17 gene.

This gene encodes a protein present at the cell surface. Studies in rabbits suggest that in sperm the protein is involved in fertilization by binding to the zona pellucida of the oocyte. Other studies in rabbits suggest that it is also involved in additional cell-cell adhesion functions such as immune cell migration and metastasis.
