= Uromodulin =

Mammalian protein found in Homo sapiens

UMOD

Identifiers
- Aliases: UMOD, ADMCKD2, FJHN, HNFJ, HNFJ1, MCKD2, THGP, THP, uromodulin, ADTKD1
- External IDs: OMIM: 191845; MGI: 102674; GeneCards: UMOD
Available structures
| PDB | Ortholog search: PDBe RCSB |
| PDB | List of PDB id codes 4WRN |

Gene location (Human)
| Chr. | Chromosome 16 (human) |
| Band | 16p12.3 | Start | 20,333,051 bp |
| Band | 16p12.3 | End | 20,356,301 bp |

Gene location (Mouse)
| Chr. | Chromosome 7 (mouse) |
| Band | 7 F2|7 63.88 cM | Start | 119,061,934 bp |
| Band | 7 F2|7 63.88 cM | End | 119,078,505 bp |
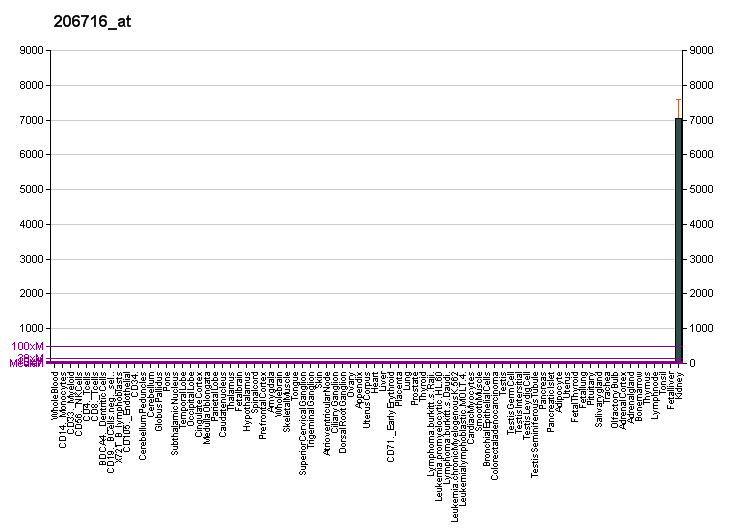
RNA expression pattern
| Bgee | Human / Mouse (ortholog); Top expressed in: renal medulla; kidney tubule; metanephric glomerulus; body of pancreas; human kidney; epithelium of colon; urethra; gallbladder; bone marrow cell; body of stomach / Top expressed in: human kidney; right kidney; distal tubule; Ascending limb of loop of Henle; thick ascending limb of loop of Henle; thin ascending limb of loop of Henle; convoluted tubule; distal convoluted tubule; proximal tubule; primary visual cortex; More reference expression data |
| BioGPS | More reference expression data |
Gene ontology
| Molecular function | calcium ion binding; IgG binding |
| Cellular component | cell projection; spindle pole; membrane; plasma membrane; extracellular region; basolateral plasma membrane; apical plasma membrane; ciliary membrane; anchored component of membrane; extracellular exosome; extrinsic component of membrane; Golgi lumen; cilium |
| Biological process | leukocyte cell-cell adhesion; chemical homeostasis; heterophilic cell-cell adhesion via plasma membrane cell adhesion molecules; excretion; metanephric distal convoluted tubule development; metanephric ascending thin limb development; cellular defense response; neutrophil migration; metanephric thick ascending limb development; negative regulation of cell population proliferation; protein N-linked glycosylation via asparagine; ion homeostasis |
Sources:Amigo / QuickGO
Orthologs
| Databases | NCBI: entry; OMA: entry |
| Species | Human | Mouse |
| Entrez | 7369 | 22242 |
| Ensembl | ENSG00000169344 | ENSMUSG00000030963 |
| UniProt | P07911 | Q91X17 |
| RefSeq (mRNA) | NM_001008389; NM_001278614; NM_003361; NM_001378232; NM_001378233 NM_001378234; NM_001378235; NM_001378237 | NM_001278605; NM_009470 |
| RefSeq (protein) | NP_001008390; NP_001265543; NP_003352; NP_001365161; NP_001365162 NP_001365163; NP_001365164; NP_001365166 | NP_001265534; NP_033496 |
| Location (UCSC) | Chr 16: 20.33 – 20.36 Mb | Chr 7: 119.06 – 119.08 Mb |
| PubMed search |
- Wikidata
| View/Edit Human | View/Edit Mouse |

Uromodulin (UMOD),Tamm–Horsfall protein (THP), is a zona pellucida-like domain-containing glycoprotein that in humans is encoded by the UMOD gene. Uromodulin is the most abundant protein excreted in ordinary urine.

The human UMOD gene is located on chromosome 16. While several transcript variants may exist for this gene, the full-length natures of only two have been described to date. These two represent the major variants of this gene and encode the same isoform.

== Protein ==
THP is a GPI-anchored glycoprotein. It is not derived from blood plasma but is produced by the thick ascending limb of the loop of Henle of the mammalian kidney. While the monomeric molecule has a MW of approximately 85 kDa, it is physiologically present in urine in large aggregates of up to several million Da. When this protein is concentrated at low pH, it forms a gel. Uromodulin represents the most abundant protein in normal human urine (results based on MSMS determinations). It is the matrix of urinary casts derived from the secretion of renal tubular cells.

== Structure ==
Uromodulin consists of an EGF domain (EGF I); two calcium-binding EGF domains (EGF II, III); a cysteine-rich decoy module consisting of a β-hairpin and a D10C domain (previously referred to as D8C); a fourth EGF domain; and a C-terminal bipartite Zona pellucida-like (ZP) module consisting of ZP-N and ZP-C domains separated by an interdomain linker. The ZP domain polymerizes into filaments, with protruding arms that correspond to the EGF I-III domains and the decoy module.

== Function ==
Uromodulin excretion in urine follows proteolytic cleavage of the ectodomain of its glycophosphatidylinositol-anchored counterpart that is situated on the luminal cell surface of the loop of Henle. Uromodulin may act as a constitutive inhibitor of calcium crystallization in renal fluids. The excretion of uromodulin in urine may provide defense against urinary tract infections caused by uropathogenic bacteria.

The function of THP is not well understood. Studies using THP deficient mice revealed that THP may have a role in regulatory physiology and actually participates in transporter function. A role in bacterial binding and sequestration is suggested by studies showing that Escherichia coli which express MS (mannose-sensitive) pili or fimbriae (also fimbria, from the Latin word for "fringe") can be trapped by Tamm–Horsfall protein via its mannose-containing side chains. THP may also be important in protection from kidney injury by down-regulating inflammation.

== Clinical significance ==
Uropontin, nephrocalcin and uromodulin (this protein) are the three known urinary glycoproteins that affect the formation of calcium-containing kidney stones or calculus. Tamm–Horsfall protein is part of the matrix in renal calculi but a role in kidney stone formation remains debatable. However, decreased levels of Tamm–Horsfall in urine have been found to be a good indicator of kidney stones.

Defects in this gene are associated with the autosomal dominant renal disorders medullary cystic kidney disease-2 (MCKD2) and autosomal dominant tubulointerstitial kidney disease (ADTKD) (previously familial juvenile hyperuricemic nephropathy (FJHN)). These disorders are characterized by juvenile onset of hyperuricemia, gout, and progressive kidney failure.

Antibodies to Tamm–Horsfall protein have been seen in various forms of nephritis (e.g., Balkan nephropathy), however, it remains unclear whether there is any pathophysiologic relevance to these findings.

Another disease associated with mutations in this gene is Uromodulin-associated Kidney Disease (UKD), a rare autosomal dominant progressive failure of the kidneys.

In multiple myeloma, there is often protein cast in the distal convoluted tubule and collecting duct of the kidneys, mainly consisting of immunoglobulin light chain known as Bence Jones protein, but often also containing Tamm–Horsfall protein. This is known as myeloma cast nephropathy.

== History ==
The glycoprotein was first purified in 1950 by Igor Tamm and Frank Horsfall from the urine of healthy individuals. It was later detected in the urine of all mammals studied.
