= Henry Gawen Sutton =

British physician (1837–1891)

Henry Gawen Sutton (1837–9 June 1891) was an English physician. He was born in Middlesbrough, England and obtained his medical training at Middlesbrough, but qualified at University College London, and practiced in London for the rest of his life, initially as a general practitioner but later, after gaining membership of the Royal College of Physicians, as a physician. He worked at the City of London Hospital for Diseases of the Chest, the London Hospital, and consulted at Poplar Hospital. He died of pneumonia after influenza aged 55.

He lent his name to the now outdated term "Gull-Sutton disease", described together with William Gull, to atherosclerotic chronic kidney disease. He also made contributions to the understanding of rheumatic fever and is credited with an early description of hereditary haemorrhagic telangiectasia (Rendu-Osler-Weber disease).
