= Zona pellucida =

Layer surrounding mammalian egg cells

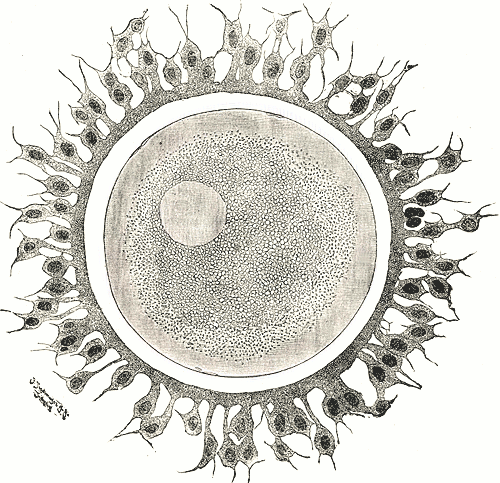
- Human ovum: The zona pellucida is seen as a thick clear girdle surrounded by the cells of the corona radiata.

Identifiers
- MeSH: D015044
- FMA: 18674

The zona pellucida (Latin meaning "transparent zone") is the specialized area surrounding the mammalian egg cell. It is also known as an egg coat. The zona pellucida is formed in early oogenesis and is essential for oocyte growth and fertilization. In other vertebrates it is called the vitelline membrane, or the vitelline envelope in invertebrates.

The zona pellucida is an extracellular matrix that surrounds the plasma membrane of the egg cell. It helps protect the egg, and has an essential role in fertilization by sperm. It is surrounded by the corona radiata. The corona is composed of cells that cared for the pre-ovulatory egg cell, and stays with the egg cell when it is emitted from the ovary.

== Structure ==
The zona pellucida is a translucent matrix of cross-linked glycoprotein filaments that surrounds the mammalian oocyte and is 6.5–20 μm thick depending on the species. Its formation, which depends on a conserved zona pellucida-like (ZP) module that mediates the polymerization of egg coat components, is critical to successful fertilization. In non-mammals, it is called the vitelline membrane or vitelline envelope.

== Function ==
The thick membrane of the zona pellucida functions to only allow species-specific fertilization; to prevent polyspermy, and enable the acrosome reaction for the successful adhesion and penetration by the sperm cell. It also allows correct embryo development and size. The major glycoproteins of the egg coat responsible are known as sperm-binding proteins.

The zona pellucida binds spermatozoa, and is required to initiate the acrosome reaction. In mice, the zona glycoprotein (ZP3) is responsible for sperm binding, adhering to proteins on the sperm plasma membrane. During the acrosome reaction, a sperm cell releases the DNA contained in the acrosomal vesicle into the egg. In other species, the process is slightly different and more complicated. Several more zona proteins have been identified.

There are two key mechanisms of interaction to prevent polyspermy (fertilization of an egg by more than one sperm). The first one is an immediate and transient early block and after a while a permanent block.

The four major sperm-binding proteins, or sperm-receptors, are ZP1, ZP2, ZP3, and ZP4. They bind to capacitated spermatozoa and induce the acrosome reaction. Successful fertilization depends on the ability of sperm to penetrate the extracellular matrix of the zona pellucida that surrounds the egg.

- ZP3 allows species-specific sperm binding. It's sufficient and necessary for sperm-binding in mice in vitro, but is insufficient for fertilization in vivo. It promotes the acrosome reaction in human sperm.
- ZP2 selectively activates sperm of the correct species, and it also appears necessary for sperm binding in vivo, for both humans and mice. In addition, it's cleaved by ovastacin post-fertilization, which turns the ZP into a form that prevents further sperm binding.
- ZP1 cross-links ZP2 and ZP3 to form the ZP filaments. It promotes the acrosome reaction in human sperm. Notably, it is absent in pigs, cows, and dogs.
- ZP4 is absent in mice. It promotes the acrosome reaction in human sperm.

In humans, five days after fertilization, the blastocyst performs zona hatching; the zona pellucida degenerates and decomposes, to be replaced by the underlying layer of trophoblastic cells.

== Immunocontraception ==
ZP module-containing glycoproteins ZP1, ZP2, ZP3 and ZP4 are targets for immunocontraception in mammals.

In non-mammals, the zona pellucida is called the vitelline membrane or envelope, and the vitelline envelope in insects, and plays an important role in preventing cross-breeding of different species, especially in species such as fish that fertilize outside of the body.

The zona pellucida is commonly used to control wildlife population problems by immunocontraception. When the zona pellucida of one animal species is injected into the bloodstream of another, it results in sterility of the second species due to immune response. This effect can be temporary or permanent, depending on the method used. In New Jersey, immunocontraception using porcine zona pellucida has been trialled for the control of deer.

== Additional images ==
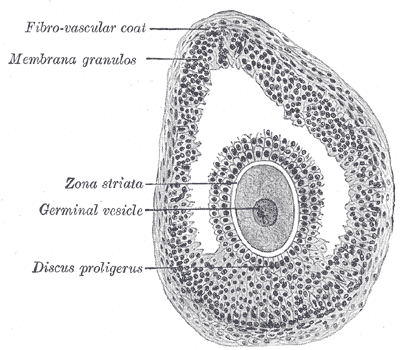
Section of vesicular ovarian follicle of a cat, x 50
