= Frank Horsfall =

American microbiologist specializing in pathology

Frank Lappin Horsfall, Jr.
- Born: December 14, 1906; Seattle, Washington
- Died: February 19, 1971 (aged 64); New York City
- Education: University of Washington; McGill University
- Known for: Tamm–Horsfall protein
- Awards: Eli Lilly and Company-Elanco Research Award (1937)
- Scientific career
- Fields: Medicine

Frank Lappin Horsfall, Jr. (Seattle, December 14, 1906 – New York City, February 19, 1971) was an American microbiologist specializing in pathology. He worked at the Rockefeller Institute, New York, from 1934 to 1960 and in the early 1950s ran the Virology Laboratory there. The Tamm–Horsfall protein was first purified in 1952 during his work with Igor Tamm.

He was elected in 1948 a member of the United States National Academy of Sciences. He was later elected to the American Philosophical Society in 1956 and the American Academy of Arts and Sciences in 1967. He was the president of the American Association of Immunologists for the academic year 1967–1968.

A collection of his papers is held at the National Library of Medicine.
