= ZP4 =

Protein-coding gene in humans

Identifiers
- Aliases: ZP4, ZBP, ZP1, ZPB, Zp-4, zona pellucida glycoprotein 4, ZPB2, ZP1B
- External IDs: OMIM: 613514; GeneCards: ZP4

Gene location (Human)
Chr.	Chromosome 1 (human)
Band	1q43	Start	237,877,864 bp
Band	1q43	End	237,890,922 bp
RNA expression pattern
Bgee	Human / Mouse (ortholog); Top expressed in: oocyte; secondary oocyte; pancreatic ductal cell; tibialis anterior muscle; cartilage tissue; mucosa of ileum; deltoid muscle; skin of thigh; placenta; pharynx / n/a; More reference expression data
BioGPS	n/a
Gene ontology
Molecular function	acrosin binding; identical protein binding; protein binding
Cellular component	plasma membrane; membrane; integral component of membrane; extracellular region
Biological process	binding of sperm to zona pellucida; negative regulation of binding of sperm to zona pellucida; positive regulation of humoral immune response; positive regulation of T cell proliferation; positive regulation of acrosome reaction; acrosomal vesicle exocytosis; single fertilization
Sources:Amigo / QuickGO
Orthologs
Databases	NCBI: entry; OMA: entry
Species	Human	Mouse
Entrez	57829	n/a
Ensembl	ENSG00000116996	n/a
UniProt	Q12836	n/a
RefSeq (mRNA)	NM_021186	n/a
RefSeq (protein)	NP_067009	n/a
Location (UCSC)	Chr 1: 237.88 – 237.89 Mb	n/a
PubMed search		n/a
- Wikidata
View/Edit Human

Zona pellucida sperm-binding protein 4, ZP-4 or avilesine, named after its discoverer Manuel Avilés Sánchez is a protein that in humans is encoded by the ZP4 gene.

== Function ==
The zona pellucida is an extracellular matrix that surrounds the oocyte and early embryo. It is composed primarily of three or four glycoproteins with various functions during fertilization and preimplantation development. The nascent protein contains a N-terminal signal peptide sequence, a conserved zona pellucida-like domain, a consensus furin cleavage site, and a C-terminal transmembrane domain. It is hypothesized that furin cleavage results in release of the mature protein from the plasma membrane for subsequent incorporation into the zona pellucida matrix. However, the requirement for furin cleavage in this process remains controversial based on mouse studies.

Previously, this gene has been referred to as ZP1 or ZPB and thought to have similar functions as mouse Zp1. However, a human gene with higher similarity and chromosomal synteny to mouse Zp1 has been assigned the symbol ZP1 and this gene has been assigned the symbol ZP4.
