= SOHLH2 =

Protein-coding gene in humans

Identifiers
- Aliases: SOHLH2, SPATA28, TEB1, bHLHe81, spermatogenesis and oogenesis specific basic helix-loop-helix 2, SOSF2
- External IDs: OMIM: 616066; GeneCards: SOHLH2

Gene location (Human)
Chr.	Chromosome 13 (human)
Band	13q13.3	Start	36,168,217 bp
Band	13q13.3	End	36,214,588 bp
RNA expression pattern
Bgee	Human / Mouse (ortholog); Top expressed in: secondary oocyte; sperm; testicle; left testis; gonad; right testis; muscle layer of sigmoid colon; placenta; nucleus accumbens; prefrontal cortex / n/a; More reference expression data
BioGPS	n/a
Gene ontology
Molecular function	core promoter sequence-specific DNA binding; DNA-binding transcription activator activity, RNA polymerase II-specific; protein dimerization activity; DNA binding; protein homodimerization activity; protein heterodimerization activity; DNA-binding transcription factor activity, RNA polymerase II-specific
Cellular component	nucleus; cytoplasm
Biological process	transcription by RNA polymerase II; multicellular organism development; oogenesis; transcription, DNA-templated; regulation of transcription, DNA-templated; positive regulation of transcription by RNA polymerase II; spermatogenesis; oocyte differentiation; cell differentiation; regulation of transcription by RNA polymerase II
Sources:Amigo / QuickGO
Orthologs
Databases	NCBI: entry; OMA: entry
Species	Human	Mouse
Entrez	54937	n/a
Ensembl	ENSG00000120669	n/a
UniProt	Q9NX45	n/a
RefSeq (mRNA)	NM_017826; NM_001282147	n/a
RefSeq (protein)	NP_001269076; NP_060296	n/a
Location (UCSC)	Chr 13: 36.17 – 36.21 Mb	n/a
PubMed search		n/a
- Wikidata
View/Edit Human

Spermatogenesis and oogenesis specific basic helix-loop-helix 2 is a protein which in humans is encoded by the gene SOHLH2. Like its homolog, SOHLH1, this protein is a transcription factor which is involved in the regulating the production of sperm and egg cells.

== Function ==
=== Spermatogenesis ===
Research in non-human animals suggests that SOHLH2 acts together with SOHLH1 to induce more sperm precursor cells (including spermatogonial stem cells or SSCs) to differentiate and ultimately become mature sperm cells. This function seems to be closely tied to SOHLH1. The two transcription factors are able to bind together to form heterodimers (in addition to binding to themselves as homodimers), and appear to cross-regulate by binding to each others promotors. Like SOHLH1, mice without functional SOLHLH2 genes display very similar patterns of defects (notably male/female infertility), but knocking-out both SOHLH1 and SOHLH2 has a roughly similar effect to knocking out one or the other. SOHLH1/2's function seems to be through their interaction and suppression of the genes that promote SSC maintenance including POU5F1, NANOS2, and GDNF receptor subunits.

=== Oogenesis ===
Analogous to its expression in sperm production, SOHLH2 is highly expressed in the early precursors of egg cells and ovarian follicles. SOHLH2, in coordination with SOHLH1, NOBOX, and LHX8, is involved in triggering the progression of (early) primordial follicles into more mature primary follicles. Mice without a functional SOHLH2 gene produce primordial follicles, but these fail to differentiate properly, and are rapidly lost after birth.

== Clinical significance ==
In spite of the significant effects in animal models, the connection between SOHLH2 mutations and human disease has not been as well established as SOHLH1. Though, there have been some reports of an association with primary ovarian insufficiency.
