= TECTB =

Protein-coding gene in the species Homo sapiens

Identifiers
- Aliases: TECTB, tectorin beta
- External IDs: OMIM: 602653; MGI: 109574; HomoloGene: 7568; GeneCards: TECTB; OMA:TECTB - orthologs

Gene location (Human)
Chr.	Chromosome 10 (human)
Band	10q25.2	Start	112,283,400 bp
Band	10q25.2	End	112,305,038 bp

Gene location (Mouse)
Chr.	Chromosome 19 (mouse)
Band	19 D2|19 51.13 cM	Start	55,169,165 bp
Band	19 D2|19 51.13 cM	End	55,184,745 bp
RNA expression pattern
Bgee	Human / Mouse (ortholog); Top expressed in: retinal pigment epithelium; liver; right lobe of liver; right lobe of thyroid gland; putamen; temporal lobe; mesencephalon; left lobe of thyroid gland; substantia nigra; ventricular zone / Top expressed in: vestibular sensory epithelium; organ of Corti; utricle; epithelium of macula of utricle of membranous labyrinth; embryo; cochlea; saccule; epithelium of macula of saccule of membranous labyrinth; vestibular membrane of cochlear duct; stria vascularis; More reference expression data
BioGPS	n/a
Gene ontology
Molecular function	extracellular matrix structural constituent
Cellular component	anchored component of membrane; membrane; extracellular region; plasma membrane; extracellular matrix
Biological process	C-terminal protein lipidation
Sources:Amigo / QuickGO
Orthologs
Species	Human	Mouse
Entrez	6975	21684
Ensembl	ENSG00000119913	ENSMUSG00000024979
UniProt	Q96PL2	O08524
RefSeq (mRNA)	NM_058222	NM_009348
RefSeq (protein)	NP_478129	NP_033374
Location (UCSC)	Chr 10: 112.28 – 112.31 Mb	Chr 19: 55.17 – 55.18 Mb
PubMed search
- Wikidata
View/Edit Human	View/Edit Mouse

Beta-tectorin is a protein that in humans is encoded by the TECTB gene.

== Function ==
The genes for alpha-tectorin and beta-tectorin (this protein) encode the major noncollagenous proteins of the tectorial membrane of the cochlea.
