= Endoglin =

Protein-coding gene in the species Homo sapiens

ENG

Identifiers
- Aliases: ENG, Eng, AI528660, AI662476, CD105, Endo, S-endoglin, END, HHT1, ORW1, endoglin
- External IDs: OMIM: 131195; MGI: 95392; GeneCards: ENG

Gene location (Human)
| Chr. | Chromosome 9 (human) |
| Band | 9q34.11 | Start | 127,815,013 bp |
| Band | 9q34.11 | End | 127,854,658 bp |

Gene location (Mouse)
| Chr. | Chromosome 2 (mouse) |
| Band | 2 B|2 22.09 cM | Start | 32,536,607 bp |
| Band | 2 B|2 22.09 cM | End | 32,572,681 bp |
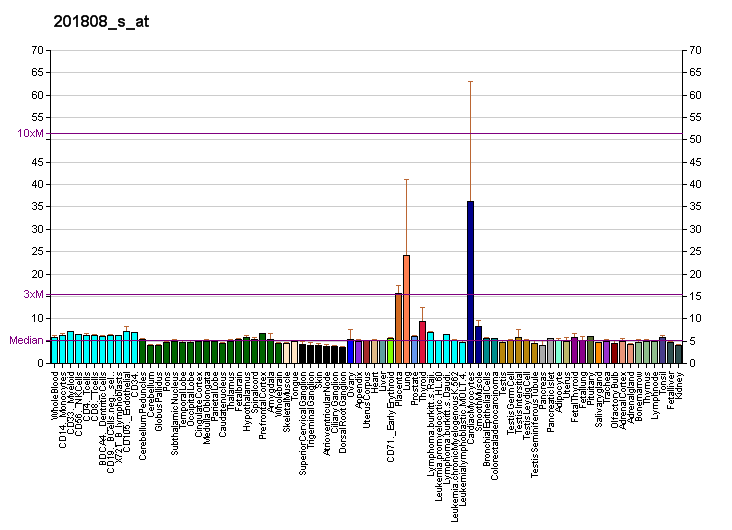

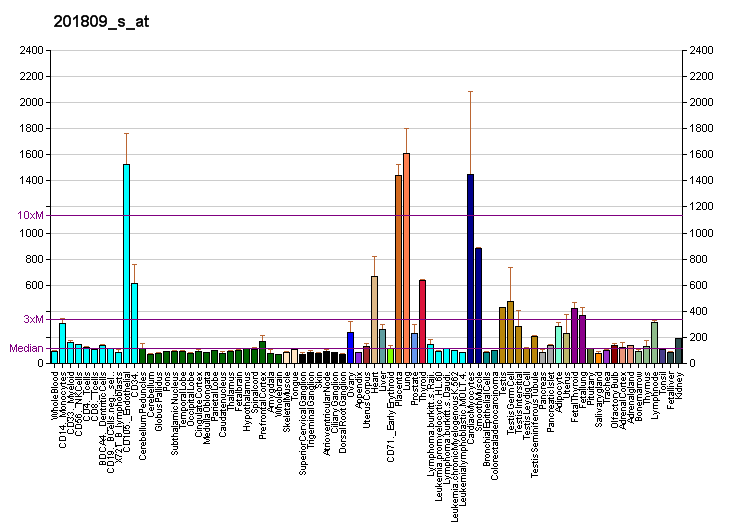
RNA expression pattern
| Bgee | Human / Mouse (ortholog); Top expressed in: right lung; right auricle of heart; apex of heart; right lobe of thyroid gland; left ovary; right ovary; right coronary artery; upper lobe of left lung; ascending aorta; Descending thoracic aorta / Top expressed in: lactiferous gland; ankle joint; right lung; choroid plexus of fourth ventricle; cardiac muscle tissue of left ventricle; right lung lobe; external carotid artery; Ileal epithelium; internal carotid artery; right ventricle; More reference expression data |
| BioGPS | More reference expression data |
Gene ontology
| Molecular function | type I transforming growth factor beta receptor binding; protein homodimerization activity; activin binding; transforming growth factor beta-activated receptor activity; galactose binding; glycosaminoglycan binding; BMP binding; protein binding; transforming growth factor beta binding; transmembrane signaling receptor activity; type II transforming growth factor beta receptor binding; identical protein binding |
| Cellular component | integral component of membrane; membrane; focal adhesion; receptor complex; endothelial microparticle; external side of plasma membrane; cell surface; extracellular space; plasma membrane |
| Biological process | cell migration involved in endocardial cushion formation; response to hypoxia; regulation of transcription, DNA-templated; negative regulation of nitric-oxide synthase activity; negative regulation of protein autophosphorylation; venous blood vessel morphogenesis; cell motility; positive regulation of pathway-restricted SMAD protein phosphorylation; regulation of phosphorylation; extracellular matrix disassembly; positive regulation of systemic arterial blood pressure; wound healing; negative regulation of transcription by RNA polymerase II; negative regulation of transforming growth factor beta receptor signaling pathway; BMP signaling pathway; negative regulation of pathway-restricted SMAD protein phosphorylation; positive regulation of angiogenesis; negative regulation of endothelial cell proliferation; vasculogenesis; heart looping; development of the heart; regulation of cell adhesion; cell adhesion; negative regulation of cell migration; regulation of cell population proliferation; angiogenesis; artery morphogenesis; central nervous system vasculogenesis; smooth muscle tissue development; positive regulation of BMP signaling pathway; branching involved in blood vessel morphogenesis; cell chemotaxis; transforming growth factor beta receptor signaling pathway; cell migration; detection of hypoxia; regulation of transforming growth factor beta receptor signaling pathway; positive regulation of gene expression; regulation of cardiac muscle cell apoptotic process; bone development; positive regulation of protein phosphorylation; endocardial cushion to mesenchymal transition; sprouting angiogenesis; response to corticosteroid; extracellular matrix constituent secretion; regulation of cell proliferation involved in heart morphogenesis; response to transforming growth factor beta; positive regulation of collagen biosynthetic process; cellular response to mechanical stimulus; outflow tract septum morphogenesis; epithelial to mesenchymal transition involved in endocardial cushion formation; endocardial cushion morphogenesis; cardiac ventricle morphogenesis; cardiac atrium morphogenesis; ventricular trabecula myocardium morphogenesis; negative regulation of gene expression; dorsal aorta morphogenesis; positive regulation of transcription by RNA polymerase II; atrial cardiac muscle tissue morphogenesis; vascular associated smooth muscle cell development; positive regulation of epithelial to mesenchymal transition involved in endocardial cushion formation; positive regulation of vascular associated smooth muscle cell differentiation; atrioventricular canal morphogenesis; regulation of cardiac neural crest cell migration involved in outflow tract morphogenesis; positive regulation of protein kinase B signaling |
Sources:Amigo / QuickGO
Orthologs
| Databases | NCBI: entry; OMA: entry |
| Species | Human | Mouse |
| Entrez | 2022 | 13805 |
| Ensembl | ENSG00000106991 | ENSMUSG00000026814 |
| UniProt | P17813; Q96CG0 | Q63961 |
| RefSeq (mRNA) | NM_000118; NM_001114753; NM_001278138 | NM_001146348; NM_001146350; NM_007932 |
| RefSeq (protein) | NP_000109; NP_001108225; NP_001265067; NP_001108225.1; NP_001265067.1 | NP_001139820; NP_001139822; NP_031958 |
| Location (UCSC) | Chr 9: 127.82 – 127.85 Mb | Chr 2: 32.54 – 32.57 Mb |
| PubMed search |
- Wikidata
| View/Edit Human | View/Edit Mouse |

Endoglin (ENG) is a type I membrane glycoprotein located on cell surfaces and is part of the TGF beta receptor complex. It is also commonly referred to as CD105, END, FLJ41744, HHT1, ORW and ORW1. It has a crucial role in angiogenesis, therefore, making it an important protein for tumor growth, survival and metastasis of cancer cells to other locations in the body.

== Gene and expression ==
The human endoglin gene is located on human chromosome 9 with location of the cytogenic band at 9q34.11. Endoglin glycoprotein is encoded by 39,757 bp and translates into 658 amino acids.

The expression of the endoglin gene is usually low in resting endothelial cells. This, however, changes once neoangiogenesis begins and endothelial cells become active in places like tumor vessels, inflamed tissues, skin with psoriasis, vascular injury and during embryogenesis. The expression of the vascular system begins at about 4 weeks and continues after that. Other cells in which endoglin is expressed consist of monocytes, especially those transitioning into macrophages, low expression in normal smooth muscle cells, high expression vascular smooth muscle cells and in kidney and liver tissues undergoing fibrosis.

== Structure ==
The glycoprotein consists of a homodimer of 180 kDA stabilized by intermolecular disulfide bonds. It has a large extracellular domain of about 561 amino acids, a hydrophobic transmembrane domain and a short cytoplasmic tail domain composed of 45 amino acids. The 260 amino acid region closest to the extracellular membrane is referred to as the ZP domain (or, more correctly, ZP module). The outermost extracellular region is termed as the orphan domain (or, more correctly, orphan region (OR)) and it is the part that binds ligands such as BMP-9.

There are two isoforms of endoglin created by alternative splicing: the long isoform (L-endoglin) and the short isoform (S-endoglin). However, the L-isoform is expressed to a greater extent than the S-isoform. A soluble form of endoglin can be produced by the proteolytic cleaving action of metalloproteinase MMP-14 in the extracellular domain near the membrane. It has been found on endothelial cells in all tissues, activated macrophages, activated monocytes, lymphoblasts fibroblasts, and smooth muscle cells. Endoglin was first identified using monoclonal antibody (mAb) 44G4 but more mAbs against endoglin have been discovered, giving more ways to identify it in tissues.

It is suggested that endoglin has 5 potential N-linked glycosylation sites in the N-terminal domain (of which N102 was experimentally observed in the crystal structure of the orphan region (PDB: 5I04)) and an O-glycan domain near the membrane domain that is rich in Serine and Threonine. The cytoplasmic tail contains a PDZ-binding motif that allows it to bind to PDZ containing proteins and interact with them. It contains an Arginine-Glycine-Aspartic Acid (RGD) tripeptide sequence that enables cellular adhesion, through the binding of integrins or other RGD binding receptors that are present in the extracellular matrix (ECM). This RGD sequence on endoglin is the first RGD sequence identified on endothelial tissue.

X-ray crystallographic structures of human endoglin (PDB: 5I04, 5HZV) and its complex with ligand BMP-9 (PDB: 5HZW) revealed that the orphan region of the protein (residues E26-S337) consists of two domains (OR1 and OR2, corresponding to residues E36-T46 + T200-C330 and residues S47-R199, respectively) with a new fold resulting from gene duplication and circular permutation. The ZP module (residues P338-G581), whose ZP-N and ZP-C moieties (residues T349-L443 and N444-S576, respectively) are closely packed against each other, mediates the homodimerization of endoglin by forming an intermolecular disulfide bond that involves cysteine 516. Together with a second intermolecular disulfide, involving cysteine 582, this generates a molecular clamp that secures the ligand via interaction of two copies of OR1 with the knuckle regions of homodimeric BMP-9. In addition to rationalizing a large number of HHT1 mutations, the crystal structure of endoglin shows that the epitope of anti-ENG monoclonal antibody TRC105 overlaps with the binding site for BMP-9.

== Interactions ==
Endoglin has been shown to interact with high affinity to TGF beta receptor 3 and TGF beta receptor 1, and with lower affinity to TGF beta receptor 2. It has high sequence similarity to another TGF beta binding protein, betaglycan, which was one of the first cues that indicated that endoglin is a TGF beta binding proteins. However, it has been shown that TGF beta binds with high affinity to only a small amount of the available endoglin, which suggests that there is another factor regulating this binding.

Endoglin itself doesn't bind the TGF beta ligands, but is present with the TGF beta receptors when the ligand is bound, indicating an important role for endoglin. The full length endoglin will bind to the TGF beta receptor complex whether TGF beta is bound or not, but the truncated forms of endoglin have more specific binding. The amino acid (aa) region 437–558 in the extracellular domain of endoglin will bind to TGF beta receptor II. TGF beta receptor I binds to the 437-588 aa region and to the aa region between 437 and the N-terminus. Unlike TGF beta receptor I which can only bind the cytoplasmic tail when its kinase domain is inactive, TGF beta receptor II can bind endoglin with an inactive and active kinase domain. The kinase is active when it is phosphorylated. Furthermore, TGF beta receptor I will dissociate from endoglin soon after it phosphorylates its cytoplasmic tail, leaving TGF beta receptor I inactive. Endoglin is constituitively phosphorylated at the serine and threonine residues in the cytoplasmic domain. The high interaction between endoglin's cytoplasmic and extracellular tail with the TGF beta receptor complexes indicates an important role for endoglin in the modulation of the TGF beta responses, such as cellular localization and cellular migration.

Endoglin can also mediate F-actin dynamics, focal adhesions, microtubular structures, endocytic vesicular transport through its interaction with zyxin, ZRP-1, beta-arrestin and Tctex2beta, LK1, ALK5, TGF beta receptor II, and GIPC. In one study with mouse fibroblasts, the overexpression of endoglin resulted in a reduction of some ECM components, decreased cellular migration, a change in cellular morphology and intercellular cluster formation.

== Function ==
Endoglin has been found to be an auxiliary receptor for the TGF-beta receptor complex. It thus is involved in modulating a response to the binding of TGF-beta1, TGF-beta3, activin-A, BMP-2, BMP-7 and BMP-9. Beside TGF-beta signaling endoglin may have other functions. It has been postulated that endoglin is involved in the cytoskeletal organization affecting cell morphology and migration. Endoglin has a role in the development of the cardiovascular system and in vascular remodeling. Its expression is regulated during heart development. Experimental mice without the endoglin gene die due to cardiovascular abnormalities.

== Clinical significance ==
In humans endoglin may be involved in the autosomal dominant disorder known as hereditary hemorrhagic telangiectasia (HHT) type 1. HHT is actually the first human disease linked to the TGF beta receptor complex. This condition leads to frequent nose bleeds, telangiectases on skin and mucosa and may cause arteriovenous malformations in different organs including brain, lung, and liver.

=== Mutations causing HHT ===
Some mutations that lead to this disorder are:

1. a Cytosine (C) to Guanine (G) substitution which converts a tyrosine to stop codon
2. a 39 base pair deletion
3. a 2 base pair deletion which creates an early stop codon

Endoglin levels have been found to be elevated in pregnant women who subsequently develop preeclampsia.

=== Role in cancer ===
The role of endoglin plays in angiogenesis and the modulation of TGF beta receptor signaling, which mediates cellular localization, cellular migration, cellular morphology, cell proliferation, cluster formation, etc., makes endoglin an important player in tumor growth and metastasis. Being able to target and efficiently reduce or halt neoangiogenesis in tumors would prevent metastasis of primary cancer cells into other areas of the body. Also, it has been suggested that endoglin can be used for tumor imaging and prognosis.

The role of endoglin in cancer can be contradicting at times since it is needed for neoangiogenesis in tumors, which is needed for tumor growth and survival, yet the reduction in expression of endoglin has in many cancers correlated with a negative outcome of that cancer. In breast cancer, for example, the reduction of the full form of endoglin, and the increase of the soluble form of endoglin correlate with metastasis of cancer cells. The TGF beta receptor-endoglin complex relay contradicting signals from TGF beta as well. TGF beta can act as a tumor suppressor in the premalignant stage of the benign neoplasm by inhibiting its growth and inducing apoptosis. However, once the cancer cells have gone through the Hallmarks of Cancer and lost inhibitory growth responses, TGF beta mediates cell invasion, angiogenesis (with the help of endoglin), immune system evasion, and their ECM composition, allowing them to become malignant.

==== Prostate cancer and endoglin expression ====
It has been shown that endoglin expression and TGF-beta secretion are attenuated in bone marrow stromal cells when they are cocultured with prostate cancer cells. Also, the downstream TGF-beta/bone morphogenic protein (BMP) signaling pathway, which includes Smad1 and Smad2/3, were attenuated along with Smad-dependent gene transcription. Another result in this study was that both Smad1/5/8-dependent inhibitor of DNA binding 1 expression and Smad2/3-dependent plasminogen activator inhibitor I had a reduction in expression and cell proliferation. Ultimately, the cocultured prostate cancer cells altered the TGF-beta signaling in the bone stromal cells, which suggests this modulation is a mechanism of prostate cancer metastases facilitating their growth and survival in the reactive bone stroma. This study emphasizes the importance of endoglin in TGF-beta signaling pathways in other cell types other than endothelial cells.

==== As a drug target ====
TRC105 is an experimental antibody targeted at endoglin as an anti-angiogenesis treatment for soft-tissue sarcoma.

== See also ==
- Cluster of differentiation
