= Bone morphogenetic protein 10 =

Protein found in humans

BMP10

Identifiers
- Aliases: BMP10, entrez:27302, bone morphogenetic protein 10
- External IDs: OMIM: 608748; MGI: 1338820; GeneCards: BMP10

Gene location (Human)
Chr.	Chromosome 2 (human)
Band	2p13.3	Start	68,860,909 bp
Band	2p13.3	End	68,871,397 bp

Gene location (Mouse)
Chr.	Chromosome 6 (mouse)
Band	6|6 D1	Start	87,405,976 bp
Band	6|6 D1	End	87,414,659 bp
RNA expression pattern
Bgee	Human / Mouse (ortholog); Top expressed in: cardiac muscle tissue of right atrium; right auricle of heart; right lobe of liver; tibialis anterior muscle; mucosa of ileum; left ventricle; gastric mucosa; placenta; gastrocnemius muscle; blood / Top expressed in: atrium; atrioventricular valve; primordial ventricle; bulbus cordis; myocardium of atrium; endocardial cushion; cardiac muscle tissue of atrium; CA3 field; perirhinal cortex; ventricle of the heart; More reference expression data
BioGPS	n/a
Gene ontology
Molecular function	cytokine activity; receptor serine/threonine kinase binding; hormone activity; telethonin binding; protein binding; transforming growth factor beta receptor binding; growth factor activity
Cellular component	cytoplasm; extracellular region; cell surface; Z discdkac; extracellular space
Biological process	regulation of apoptotic process; pathway-restricted SMAD protein phosphorylation; regulation of MAPK cascade; heart trabecula formation; SMAD protein signal transduction; negative regulation of cardiac muscle hypertrophy; adult heart development; positive regulation of pathway-restricted SMAD protein phosphorylation; positive regulation of sarcomere organization; positive regulation of cell proliferation involved in heart morphogenesis; cardiac muscle cell proliferation; positive regulation of cardiac muscle hypertrophy; negative regulation of endothelial cell migration; positive regulation of transcription, DNA-templated; ventricular cardiac muscle tissue morphogenesis; multicellular organism development; development of the heart; positive regulation of gene expression; cell adhesion; negative regulation of cell migration; positive regulation of cardiac muscle cell proliferation; positive regulation of cartilage development; negative regulation of cell growth; regulation of cardiac muscle hypertrophy in response to stress; atrial cardiac muscle tissue morphogenesis; regulation of cardiac muscle contraction; sarcomere organization; ventricular cardiac muscle cell development; activin receptor signaling pathway; BMP signaling pathway; regulation of signaling receptor activity; cell development
Sources:Amigo / QuickGO
Orthologs
Databases	NCBI: entry; OMA: entry
Species	Human	Mouse
Entrez	27302	12154
Ensembl	ENSG00000163217	ENSMUSG00000030046
UniProt	O95393	Q9R229
RefSeq (mRNA)	NM_014482	NM_009756
RefSeq (protein)	NP_055297	NP_033886
Location (UCSC)	Chr 2: 68.86 – 68.87 Mb	Chr 6: 87.41 – 87.41 Mb
PubMed search
- Wikidata
View/Edit Human	View/Edit Mouse

Bone morphogenetic protein 10 (BMP10) is a protein that in humans is encoded by the BMP10 gene.

BMP10 is a polypeptide belonging to the TGF-β superfamily of proteins. It is a novel protein that, unlike most other BMP's, is likely to be involved in the trabeculation of the heart. Bone morphogenetic proteins are known for their ability to induce bone and cartilage development. BMP10 is categorized as a BMP since it shares a large sequence homology with other BMP's in the TGF-β superfamily.

BMP10 has also emerged as a novel atrial specific biomarker used in cardiovascular research, especially in the field of atrial fibrillation (AF). Latest research has revealed strong associations between plasma concentration of BMP10 and the risk for ischemic stroke in patients with atrial fibrillation as well as with the risk of AF recurrence after ablation for AF.
