= ASTL =

Protein-coding gene in humans

Identifiers
- Aliases: ASTL, SAS1B, astacin-like metallo-endopeptidase (M12 family), astacin like metalloendopeptidase, OOMD11, Ovastacin, Oocyte astacin
- External IDs: OMIM: 608860; MGI: 3046414; GeneCards: ASTL

Gene location (Human)
Chr.	Chromosome 2 (human)
Band	2q11.2	Start	96,122,818 bp
Band	2q11.2	End	96,138,502 bp

Gene location (Mouse)
Chr.	Chromosome 2 (mouse)
Band	2|2 F1	Start	127,180,559 bp
Band	2|2 F1	End	127,199,571 bp
RNA expression pattern
Bgee	Human / Mouse (ortholog); Top expressed in: bone marrow; bone marrow cell; gonad; olfactory zone of nasal mucosa; blood; skin of abdomen; granulocyte; skin of leg; spleen; right lung / Top expressed in: primary oocyte; secondary oocyte; zygote; embryo; morula; blastocyst; ovary; cumulus cell; More reference expression data
BioGPS	n/a
Gene ontology
Molecular function	peptidase activity; glutamic-type peptidase activity; metallopeptidase activity; hydrolase activity; metalloendopeptidase activity; zinc ion binding; aspartic-type peptidase activity; metal ion binding
Cellular component	plasma membrane; transport vesicle; cytoplasm; membrane; cytoplasmic vesicle; cortical granule
Biological process	fertilization; positive regulation of protein processing; prevention of polyspermy; proteolysis; negative regulation of binding of sperm to zona pellucida; single fertilization; cell adhesion
Sources:Amigo / QuickGO
Orthologs
Databases	NCBI: entry; OMA: entry
Species	Human	Mouse
Entrez	431705	215095
Ensembl	ENSG00000188886	ENSMUSG00000050468
UniProt	Q6HA08	Q6HA09
RefSeq (mRNA)	NM_001002036	NM_001291003; NM_172539
RefSeq (protein)	NP_001002036	NP_001277932; NP_766127
Location (UCSC)	Chr 2: 96.12 – 96.14 Mb	Chr 2: 127.18 – 127.2 Mb
PubMed search
- Wikidata
View/Edit Human	View/Edit Mouse

Astacin-like metalloendopeptidase is a protein that in humans is encoded by the ASTL gene.
