= ACVRL1 =

Protein-coding gene in humans

Identifiers
- Aliases: ACVRL1, ACVRLK1, ALK-1, ALK1, HHT, HHT2, ORW2, SKR3, TSR-I, activin A receptor like type 1
- External IDs: OMIM: 601284; MGI: 1338946; GeneCards: ACVRL1
Available structures
PDB	Ortholog search: PDBe RCSB
PDB	List of PDB id codes 2LCR, 3MY0, 4FAO
Enzyme activity
EC #	BRENDA	ExPASy	KEGG	MetaCyc
2.7.11.30	↗	↗	↗	↗

Gene location (Human)
Chr.	Chromosome 12 (human)
Band	12q13.13	Start	51,906,908 bp
Band	12q13.13	End	51,923,361 bp

Gene location (Mouse)
Chr.	Chromosome 15 (mouse)
Band	15|15 F1	Start	101,026,403 bp
Band	15|15 F1	End	101,043,217 bp
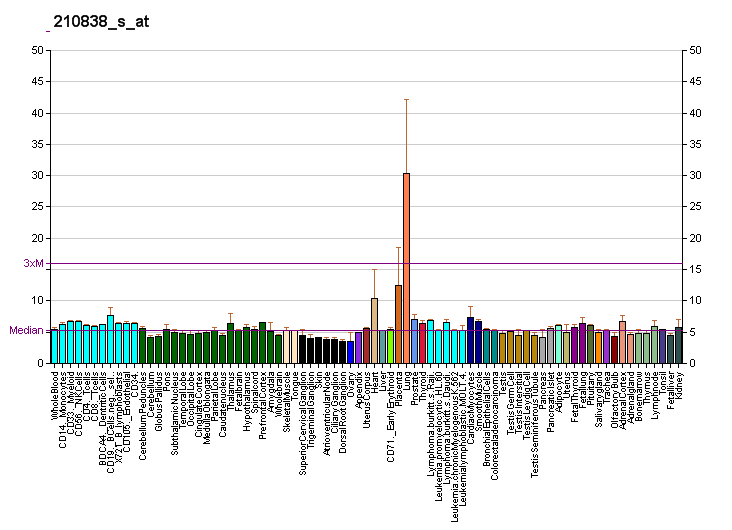
RNA expression pattern
Bgee	Human / Mouse (ortholog); Top expressed in: right lung; upper lobe of left lung; tendon of biceps brachii; apex of heart; mucosa of transverse colon; left uterine tube; lower lobe of lung; right lobe of thyroid gland; subcutaneous adipose tissue; canal of the cervix / Top expressed in: granulocyte; right lung; left lung; right lung lobe; left lung lobe; cardiac muscle tissue of left ventricle; extensor digitorum longus muscle; extraocular muscle; plantaris muscle; choroid plexus of fourth ventricle; More reference expression data
BioGPS	More reference expression data
Gene ontology
Molecular function	transferase activity; nucleotide binding; protein kinase activity; activin binding; transforming growth factor beta-activated receptor activity; metal ion binding; kinase activity; protein serine/threonine kinase activity; transmembrane receptor protein serine/threonine kinase activity; protein binding; BMP receptor activity; ATP binding; protein kinase binding; transforming growth factor beta binding; transforming growth factor beta receptor activity, type I; activin receptor activity, type I; SMAD binding; growth factor binding
Cellular component	integral component of membrane; membrane; integral component of plasma membrane; soma; dendrite; plasma membrane; cell surface; receptor complex; activin receptor complex
Biological process	cellular response to transforming growth factor beta stimulus; negative regulation of cell adhesion; regulation of transcription, DNA-templated; positive regulation of endothelial cell differentiation; positive regulation of endothelial cell proliferation; blood vessel morphogenesis; negative regulation of blood vessel endothelial cell migration; lymphangiogenesis; regulation of DNA replication; phosphorylation; endothelial tube morphogenesis; retina vasculature development in camera-type eye; wound healing, spreading of epidermal cells; lymphatic endothelial cell differentiation; positive regulation of pathway-restricted SMAD protein phosphorylation; cellular response to BMP stimulus; negative regulation of endothelial cell differentiation; in utero embryonic development; blood vessel endothelial cell proliferation involved in sprouting angiogenesis; blood circulation; positive regulation of angiogenesis; venous blood vessel development; negative regulation of endothelial cell migration; negative regulation of endothelial cell proliferation; regulation of blood vessel endothelial cell migration; regulation of blood pressure; positive regulation of transcription, DNA-templated; protein phosphorylation; blood vessel remodeling; negative regulation of cell migration; transmembrane receptor protein serine/threonine kinase signaling pathway; negative regulation of cell growth; positive regulation of chondrocyte differentiation; angiogenesis; artery development; regulation of endothelial cell proliferation; positive regulation of BMP signaling pathway; transforming growth factor beta receptor signaling pathway; negative regulation of focal adhesion assembly; negative regulation of DNA biosynthetic process; signal transduction; negative regulation of cell population proliferation; blood vessel maturation; activin receptor signaling pathway; response to hypoxia; endocardial cushion to mesenchymal transition; endocardial cushion morphogenesis; negative regulation of gene expression; dorsal aorta morphogenesis; positive regulation of transcription by RNA polymerase II; BMP signaling pathway; pattern specification process
Sources:Amigo / QuickGO
Orthologs
Databases	NCBI: entry; OMA: entry
Species	Human	Mouse
Entrez	94	11482
Ensembl	ENSG00000139567	ENSMUSG00000000530
UniProt	P37023	Q61288
RefSeq (mRNA)	NM_000020; NM_001077401	NM_001277255; NM_001277257; NM_001277258; NM_001277259; NM_009612
RefSeq (protein)	NP_000011; NP_001070869	NP_001264184; NP_001264186; NP_001264187; NP_001264188; NP_033742
Location (UCSC)	Chr 12: 51.91 – 51.92 Mb	Chr 15: 101.03 – 101.04 Mb
PubMed search
- Wikidata
View/Edit Human	View/Edit Mouse

Serine/threonine-protein kinase receptor R3 is an enzyme that in humans is encoded by the ACVRL1 gene.

ACVRL1 is a receptor in the TGF beta signaling pathway. It is also known as activin receptor-like kinase 1, or ALK1.

== Function ==
This gene encodes a type I cell-surface receptor for the TGF-beta superfamily of ligands. It shares with other type I receptors a high degree of similarity in serine-threonine kinase subdomains, a glycine- and serine-rich region (called the GS domain) preceding the kinase domain, and a short C-terminal tail. The encoded protein, sometimes termed ALK1, shares similar domain structures with other closely related ALK or activin receptor-like kinase proteins that form a subfamily of receptor serine/threonine kinases. Mutations in this gene are associated with hereditary hemorrhagic telangiectasia (HHT) type 2, also known as Rendu-Osler-Weber syndrome 2.

== Pathology ==
Germline mutations of ACVRL1 are associated with:

- hereditary hemorrhagic telangiectasia type 2 (Rendu-Osler-Weber syndrome 2)
- Pulmonary arteriovenous malformations

Somatic mosaicism in ACVRL1 are associated with severe pulmonary arterial hypertension.

ACVRL1 directly interacts with low-density lipoprotein (LDL), which implies that it might initiate the early phases of atherosclerosis.

Abnormal activity of ACVRL1 has been found to be closely associated with idiopathic pulmonary arterial hypertension.

== As a drug target ==
- Dalantercept is an experimental ALK1 inhibitor.

== Closely/family related kinases ==
(Not to be confused with anaplastic lymphoma kinase (ALK) )
ALK4 is ACVR1B, ALK7 is ACVR1C, and ALK5 is [part of] the TGF-β type I receptor.

== See also ==
- TGF beta signaling pathway, see summary table for ALK*
