= Egg lysin =

Protein

Egg lysin (Sperm-lysin)

Identifiers
- Symbol: Egg_lysin
- Pfam: PF01303
- InterPro: IPR001379
- SCOP2: 1lis / SCOPe / SUPFAM
- CDD: cd00243
Available protein structures:
- PDB: 1lis :22-150 2lynB:19-150 2lisA:19-150 1lynB:28-150 3lynB:19-150 IPR001379 PF01303 (ECOD; PDBsum)
- AlphaFold: IPR001379; PF01303

Egg lysin is a Mollusca protein that creates a hole in the envelope of the egg thereby allowing the sperm to pass through the envelope and fuse with the egg.

Fertilization proteins are acrosomal proteins involved in various roles during the fertilization process. Structurally these proteins consist of a closed bundle of helices with a right-hand twist. Lysin and SP18, both characterised in abalone, are two evolutionarily related fertilization proteins that have distinctive roles.

Following its release from sperm, lysin binds to the egg vitelline envelope (VE) via the VE receptor for lysin (VERL), then non-enzymatically dissolves the VE to create a hole, thereby allowing the sperm to pass through the envelope and fuse with the egg. Lysins exhibit species-specific binding to their egg receptor, possibly through differences in charged surface residues. SP18 is also released from sperm, acting as a potent fusagen of liposomes to mediate the fusion between the sperm and egg cell membranes. Despite a similarity in the overall fold, the variation in the surface features of SP18 and lysin account for their different roles in fertilization.

The molecular basis of VERL-lysin interaction was revealed in June 2017 by researchers at Karolinska Institutet and ESRF, who reported X-ray crystallographic and biochemical studies of both species-specific and non-species-specific complexes between the two proteins. The corresponding 3D structures (PDB: 5MR3 and PDB: 5IIA, 5IIB), which suggest a mechanism for vitelline envelope dissolution by lysin, visualized for the first time how sperm interacts with the egg coat at the atomic level.
