= GW-788,388 =

Synthetic compound

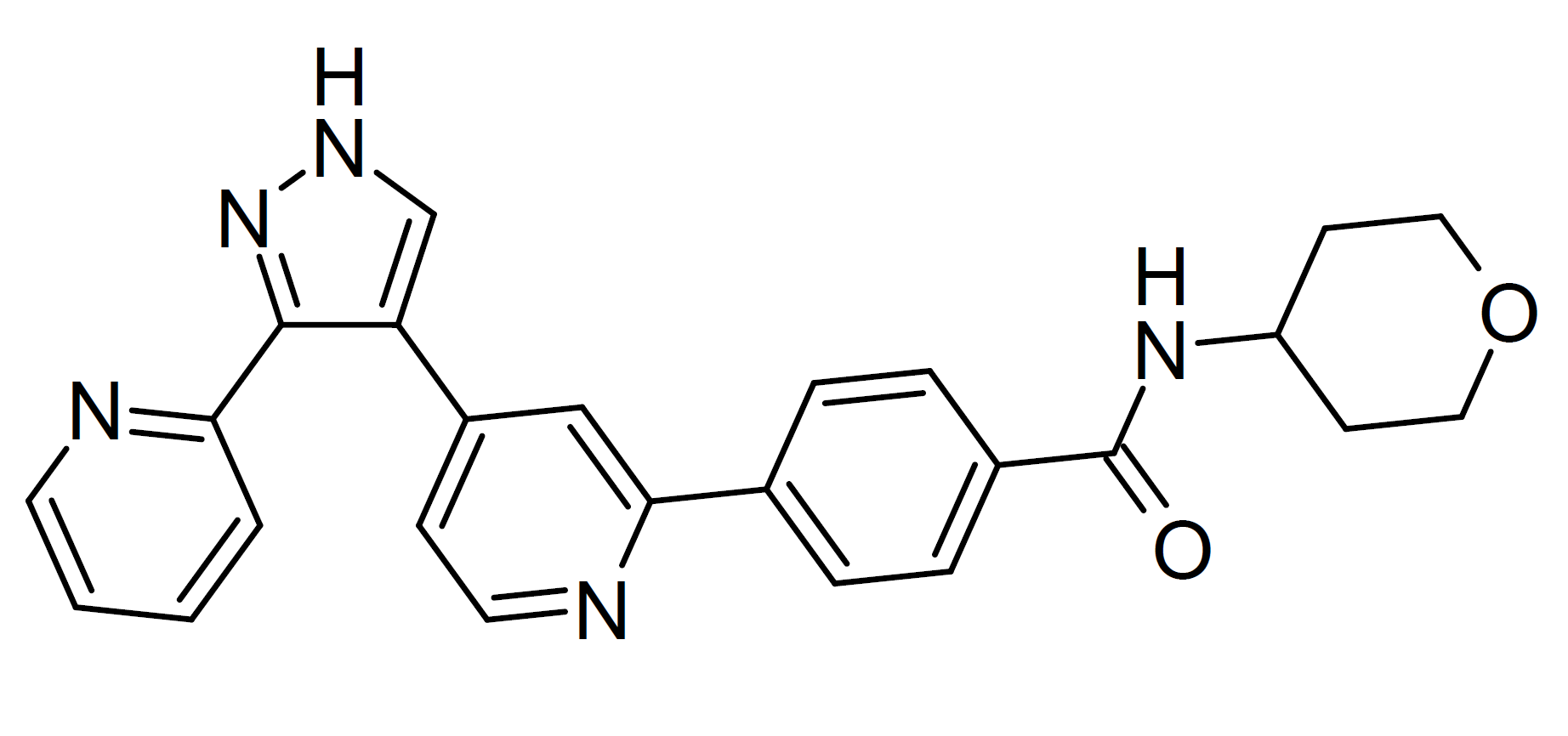

Identifiers
- IUPAC name: 4-(4-(3-(Pyridin-2-yl)-1H-pyrazol-4-yl)pyridin-2-yl)-N-(tetrahydro-2H-pyran-4-yl)benzamide
- CAS Number: 452342-67-5
- PubChem CID: 10202642
- ChemSpider: 8378140
- UNII: N14114957J
- ChEMBL: ChEMBL202887

Chemical and physical data
- Formula: C_{25}H_{23}N_{5}O_{2}
- Molar mass: 425.492 g·mol^{−1}
- 3D model (JSmol): Interactive image
- SMILES: C1COCCC1NC(=O)C2=CC=C(C=C2)C3=NC=CC(=C3)C4=C(NN=C4)C5=CC=CC=N5
- InChI: InChI=1S/C25H23N5O2/c31-25(29-20-9-13-32-14-10-20)18-6-4-17(5-7-18)23-15-19(8-12-27-23)21-16-28-30-24(21)22-3-1-2-11-26-22/h1-8,11-12,15-16,20H,9-10,13-14H2,(H,28,30)(H,29,31); Key:SAGZIBJAQGBRQA-UHFFFAOYSA-N

GW 788388 is a synthetic compound which acts as a potent and selective inhibitor for TGF beta receptor 1. It has applications in research into various disorders such as liver, kidney and heart disease (especially associated with Chagas disease), and potential antiviral properties.

== See also ==
- Galunisertib
- LY-2109761
