= LY-2109761 =

Synthetic compound

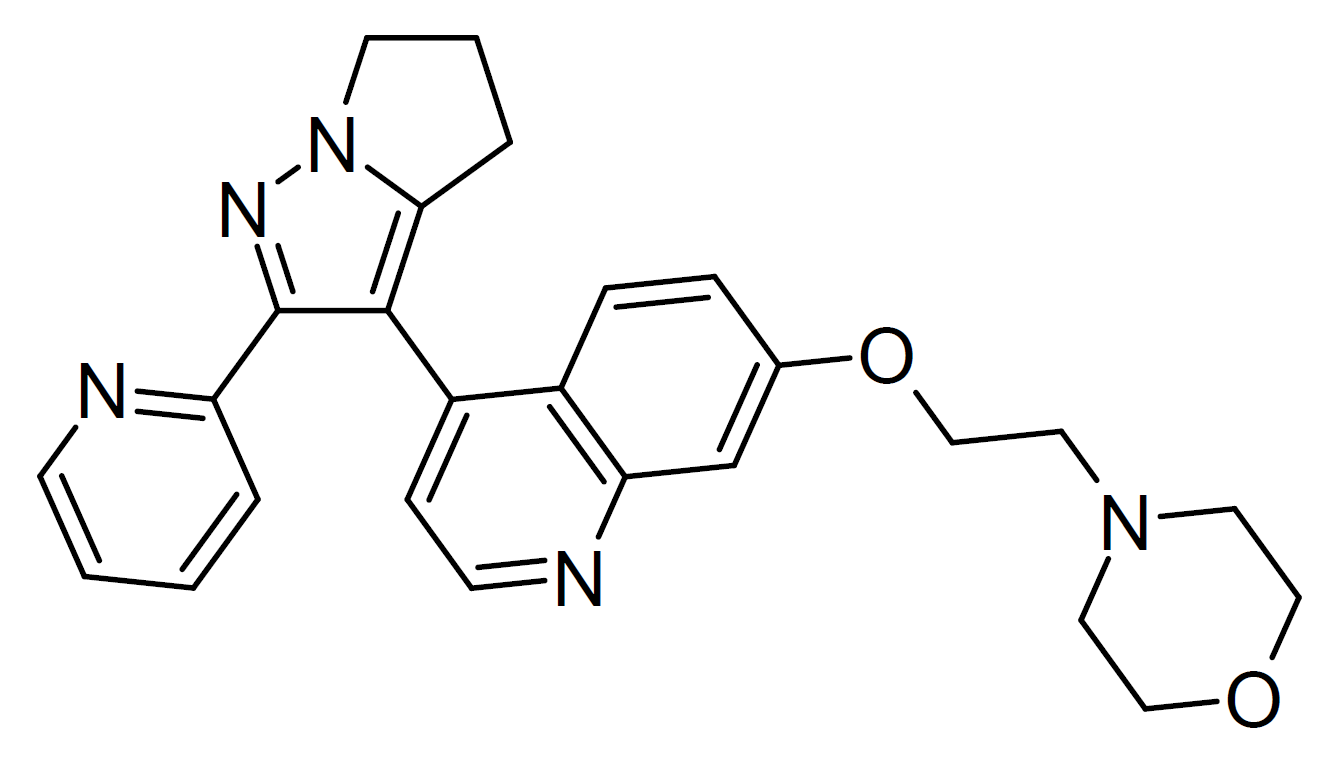

Identifiers
- IUPAC name: 4-[2-[4-(2-pyridin-2-yl-5,6-dihydro-4H-pyrrolo[1,2-b]pyrazol-3-yl)quinolin-7-yl]oxyethyl]morpholine
- CAS Number: 700874-71-1
- PubChem CID: 11655119
- IUPHAR/BPS: 8075
- ChemSpider: 9829857
- UNII: DV3HD37UBK
- ChEMBL: ChEMBL260015
- CompTox Dashboard (EPA): DTXSID30470111

Chemical and physical data
- Formula: C_{26}H_{27}N_{5}O_{2}
- Molar mass: 441.535 g·mol^{−1}
- 3D model (JSmol): Interactive image
- SMILES: C1CC2=C(C(=NN2C1)C3=CC=CC=N3)C4=C5C=CC(=CC5=NC=C4)OCCN6CCOCC6
- InChI: InChI=1S/C26H27N5O2/c1-2-9-27-22(4-1)26-25(24-5-3-11-31(24)29-26)21-8-10-28-23-18-19(6-7-20(21)23)33-17-14-30-12-15-32-16-13-30/h1-2,4,6-10,18H,3,5,11-17H2; Key:IHLVSLOZUHKNMQ-UHFFFAOYSA-N

LY-2109761 is a synthetic compound which acts as a potent and selective inhibitor for the growth factor receptor TGF beta receptor 1. It is used for research into conditions such as pulmonary fibrosis and cancer.

== See also ==
- Galunisertib
- GW788388
