= SB-431542 =

Names
- Preferred IUPAC name 4-[4-(2H-1,3-Benzodioxol-5-yl)-5-(pyridin-2-yl)-1H-imidazol-2-yl]benzamide

Identifiers
CAS Number	301836-41-9
3D model (JSmol)	Interactive image
ChEBI	CHEBI:91108
ChEMBL	ChEMBL440084
ChemSpider	3716512
IUPHAR/BPS	8216
PubChem CID	4521392
UNII	E1557V1V0N
CompTox Dashboard (EPA)	DTXSID7042693
- InChI: InChI=1S/C22H16N4O3/c23-21(27)13-4-6-14(7-5-13)22-25-19(20(26-22)16-3-1-2-10-24-16)15-8-9-17-18(11-15)29-12-28-17/h1-11H,12H2,(H2,23,27)(H,25,26) Key: FHYUGAJXYORMHI-UHFFFAOYSA-N; InChI=1/C22H16N4O3/c23-21(27)13-4-6-14(7-5-13)22-25-19(20(26-22)16-3-1-2-10-24-16)15-8-9-17-18(11-15)29-12-28-17/h1-11H,12H2,(H2,23,27)(H,25,26) Key: FHYUGAJXYORMHI-UHFFFAOYAN
- SMILES: NC(=O)c1ccc(cc1)c2nc(c3ccc4OCOc4c3)c([nH]2)c5ccccn5

Properties
Chemical formula	C_{22}H_{16}N_{4}O_{3}
Molar mass	384.395 g·mol^{−1}
- Except where otherwise noted, data are given for materials in their standard state (at 25 °C [77 °F], 100 kPa). Infobox references

SB-431542 is a drug candidate developed by GlaxoSmithKline (GSK) as an inhibitor of the activin receptor-like kinase (ALK) receptors, ALK5, ALK4 and ALK7. However, it is not an inhibitor of anaplastic lymphoma kinase (which are commonly known as ALK inhibitors).

== In-vitro studies ==
While SB-431542 has not proved directly useful for any clinical application, it is used for several applications in molecular biology. It suppresses the TGF-beta-induced proliferation of osteosarcoma cells in humans. SB431542 can also be used in combination with LDN193189, CHIR99021 and DAPT to transform astrocytes into neurons. It is also commonly used for immunological studies, for instance as a TGF-β inhibitor to facilitate the generation of dendritic cells from peripheral blood monocytes.
