= MACF1 =

Protein-coding gene in humans

Identifiers
- Aliases: MACF1, ABP620, ACF7, MACF, OFC4, microtubule-actin crosslinking factor 1, LIS9, microtubule actin crosslinking factor 1, Lnc-PMIF
- External IDs: OMIM: 608271; MGI: 108559; GeneCards: MACF1
Available structures
PDB	Ortholog search: PDBe RCSB
PDB	List of PDB id codes 4Z6G

Gene location (Human)
Chr.	Chromosome 1 (human)
Band	1p34.3	Start	39,081,316 bp
Band	1p34.3	End	39,487,177 bp

Gene location (Mouse)
Chr.	Chromosome 4 (mouse)
Band	4 D2.2|4 57.42 cM	Start	123,349,633 bp
Band	4 D2.2|4 57.42 cM	End	123,684,360 bp
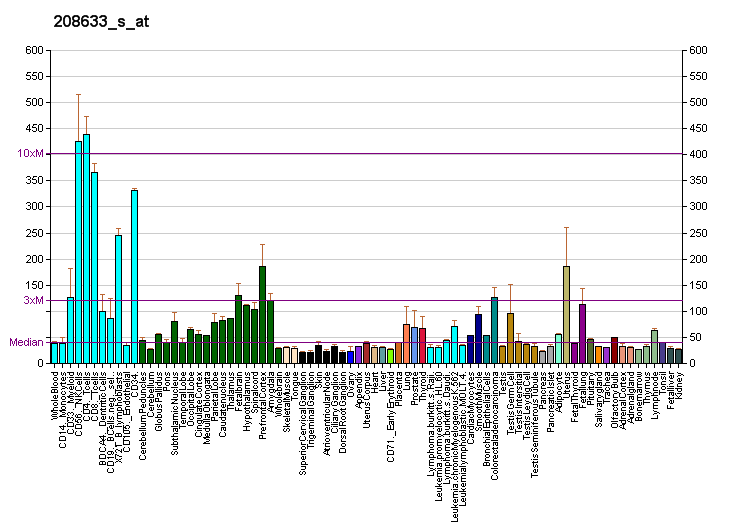

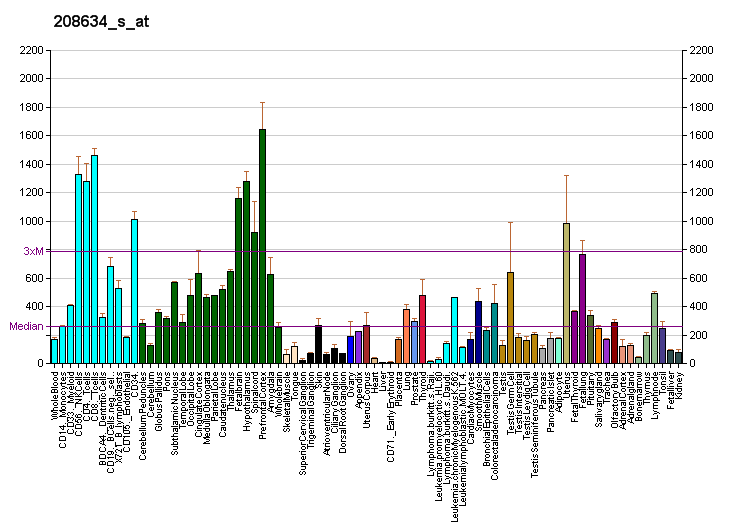

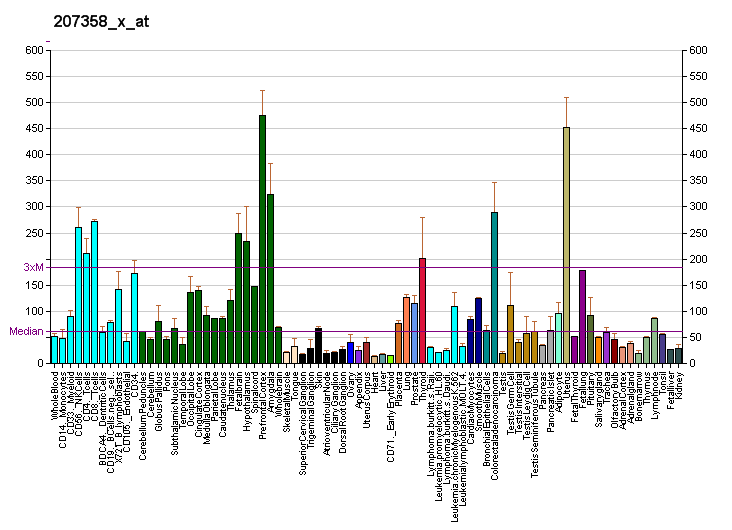
RNA expression pattern
Bgee	Human / Mouse (ortholog); Top expressed in: inferior olivary nucleus; dorsal motor nucleus of vagus nerve; right lung; Achilles tendon; epithelium of colon; corpus callosum; middle temporal gyrus; saphenous vein; upper lobe of left lung; ventricular zone / Top expressed in: left lung lobe; paraventricular nucleus of hypothalamus; mammillary body; right lung; superior colliculus; ventromedial nucleus; arcuate nucleus; right lung lobe; cerebellar vermis; ventral tegmental area; More reference expression data
BioGPS	More reference expression data
Gene ontology
Molecular function	metal ion binding; calcium ion binding; actin binding; microtubule binding; protein binding; RNA binding; cadherin binding; ATPase activity; microtubule minus-end binding; actin filament binding; structural molecule activity; cytoskeletal protein binding
Cellular component	Golgi apparatus; cell projection; membrane; microtubule; ruffle membrane; plasma membrane; cytoskeleton; cytoplasm; intermediate filament; actin cytoskeleton
Biological process	Wnt signaling pathway; Golgi to plasma membrane protein transport; wound healing; positive regulation of axon extension; regulation of microtubule-based process; regulation of epithelial cell migration; positive regulation of Wnt signaling pathway; regulation of cell migration; regulation of focal adhesion assembly; cytoskeleton organization; intermediate filament cytoskeleton organization
Sources:Amigo / QuickGO
Orthologs
Databases	NCBI: entry; OMA: entry
Species	Human	Mouse
Entrez	23499	11426
Ensembl	ENSG00000127603	ENSMUSG00000028649
UniProt	Q9UPN3	Q9QXZ0
RefSeq (mRNA)	NM_012090; NM_033044; NM_001394062	NM_001199136; NM_001199137; NM_009600
RefSeq (protein)	NP_036222	n/a
Location (UCSC)	Chr 1: 39.08 – 39.49 Mb	Chr 4: 123.35 – 123.68 Mb
PubMed search
- Wikidata
View/Edit Human	View/Edit Mouse

Microtubule-actin cross-linking factor 1, isoforms 1/2/3/5 is a protein that in humans is encoded by the MACF1 gene.

MACF1 encodes a large protein containing numerous spectrin and leucine-rich repeat (LRR) domains. MACF1 is a member of a family of proteins that form bridges between different cytoskeletal elements. This protein facilitates actin-microtubule interactions at the cell periphery and couples the microtubule network to cellular junctions.

MACF1 belongs to a subset of +TIPs or proteins which bind to growing microtubule ends called spectraplakins. Spectraplakins characteristically have distinctive microtubule and actin binding domains, which allow MACF1 to bind to both cytoskeletal elements. MACF1 goes by many names and is also called ACF7 or actin cross-linking factor 7, MACF, macrophin, trabeculin α, and ABP620. Alternatively spliced transcript variants encoding distinct isoforms of MACF1 have been described. MACF1 is also an important protein for cell migration in processes such as wound healing.

== Structure ==
MACF1 is an enormous protein of 5380 amino acid residues. The N-terminal segment has an actin binding domain and the C-terminal segment has a +TIP binding site as well as microtubule interacting domains. This allows MACF1 to crosslink both actin and microtubules. The C-terminal region contains both a Gas2-related domain and a GSR-repeat domain, which both are involved with interacting with microtubules. The C-terminus of MACF1 is thought to associate to the microtubule lattice through the acidic C-terminal tails of tubulin subunits. However, MACF1 does not always associate with the microtubule directly, and also binds through many proteins which localize at the microtubule plus end. Such proteins include EB1, CLASP1, and CLASP2, whose interactions with MACF1 were determined through coimmunoprecipitation assay. Not only does MACF1's C-terminal tail bind to microtubules, but it also has key phosphorylation sites. When these sites are phosphorylated by its regulator GSK3β, the ability of MACF1 to bind to microtubules is disrupted. MACF1 also has an actin-regulated ATPase domain, which is approximately 3000 amino acid residues long in the C-terminal region, and is responsible for cytoskeletal dynamics.

== Function ==
=== Embryonic development ===
MACF1 is important for embryonic development. For mice, by embryonic day 7.5 (E7.5), MACF1 is expressed in the headfold and primitive streak, and by E8.5 the protein is expressed in neuronal tissues and the foregut. MACF1 was shown to be present in the Wnt signaling pathway. When Wnt signalling is not present, MACF1 associates with a complex containing axin, β-catenin, GSK3β, and APC. However, upon Wnt signaling, MACF1 is involved in a translation and binding of the axin complex to LTP6 at the cell membrane. Also, MACF1 is required for sufficient β-catenin to travel to the nucleus, where subsequently TCF/β-catenin-dependent transcriptional activation of a gene T encoding the protein brachyury occurs. Brachyury is an essential transcription factor required for mesoderm formation. Without MACF1, insufficient brachyury is transcribed, and hence, the mesoderm does not form. In fact, MACF1 knock-out mice, which lack the protein, show clear developmental retardation by E7.5, and eventually die at gastrulation due to defects in the formation of the primitive streak, node, and mesoderm.

=== Cell migration ===
Mice with conditional knock-outs in MACF1 in hair follicle stem cells have defects in cell migration. The focal adhesions in cells lacking MACF1 associate with cables of F-actin, causing cell migration to stall. Wild-type cells with MACF1 present have coordinated cytoskeletal dynamics, which allow for proper cell migration. MACF1 plays an important role in microtubule organization, and without MACF1, microtubules in migrating cells are bending and curly, instead of straight and radial. When wounded, conditional knock-outs for MACF1 have around a 40% delay in migration over 4 to 6 days after injury compared to the wild-type controls, showing that MACF1 plays an important role in cell migration. There are suggestions that imply that MACF1 may play a role in golgi polarization.

The major known regulator of MACF1 is GSK3β, which when uninhibited phosphorylates MACF1 among its many other substrates and uncouples MACF1 from microtubules. The phosphorylation of MACF1 occurs in the GSR domain, which is involved in microtubule binding, and has 32% of the amino acid residues are serines or threonines. MACF1 has 6 serines, which are possible GSK3β phosphorylation sites. GSK3β activity is high in non-stimulated cells, but during cell migration its activity is dampened along the cell leading edge.

In vivo, GSK3β activity is inhibited by Wnt signalling, but in vitro it is typically inhibited by cdc42. Extracellular Wnt signalling acts on the Frizzled receptor on the cellular membrane, which then, through a signalling cascade inhibits GSK3β. The inhibition of GSK3β creates a gradient at the leading edge, allowing MACF1 to remain active and unphosphorylated, so that it can form necessary connections between microtubules and actin so migration can occur. It was found in hair follicle stem cells that phosphorylation-refractile MACF1 rescues microtubule architecture from a MACF1 knock-out, whereas phosphorylation-constitutive MACF1 is unable to rescue the phenotype. However, neither phosphorylation-refractile MACF1 nor phosphorylation-constitutive MACF1 are able to rescue polarized cell movement. This implies that the phospho-regulation dynamics permitted in the wild type MACF1 are necessary for polarized cell movement to take place.

== Clinical significance ==
In breast carcinoma cells, addition of heregulin β activates ErbB2, a receptor tyrosine, which causes microtubules to form many cell protrusions to cause cell motility. ErbB2 controls microtubule outgrowth and stabilization at the cell cortex through a specific pathway. When GSK3β is active, APC and CLASP2 are sequentially inactivated by the kinase, which gives a condition where microtubule formation is not favoured at the front of the cell. For cell migration to occur, a mechanism is needed to decrease the activity of GSK3β to promote growth of microtubules. First, ErbB2 recruits Memo (mediator of ErbB2-driven motility) to the plasma membrane, which then promotes the phosphorylation of GSK3β on serine 9. This decreases the amount of GSK3β activity, and permits the localization of APC and CLASP2 to the cell membrane, which are both microtubule +TIPs. Although CLASP2 is present at the cell membrane, it appears to have a separate, independent mechanism for microtubule growth than APC. When ErbB2 inactivates GSK3β, APC localizes to the membrane and is then able to recruit MACF1 to the membrane as well. The APC-mediated recruitment of MACF1 to the membrane is required and sufficient for microtubule capture and stabilization at the cell cortex during breast carcinoma cell motility.
