= GSK-3 =

Class of enzymes

Glycogen synthase kinase 3, catalytic domain

Identifiers
- Symbol: STKc_GSK3
- InterPro: IPR039192
- CDD: cd14137
Available protein structures:
- PDB: IPR039192
- AlphaFold: IPR039192

glycogen synthase kinase 3 alpha

Identifiers
- Symbol: GSK3A
- NCBI gene: 2931
- HGNC: 4616
- OMIM: 606784
- RefSeq: NM_019884
- UniProt: P49840

Other data
- EC number: 2.7.11.26
- Locus: Chr. 19 q13.2
Search for
- Structures: Swiss-model
- Domains: InterPro

glycogen synthase kinase 3 beta
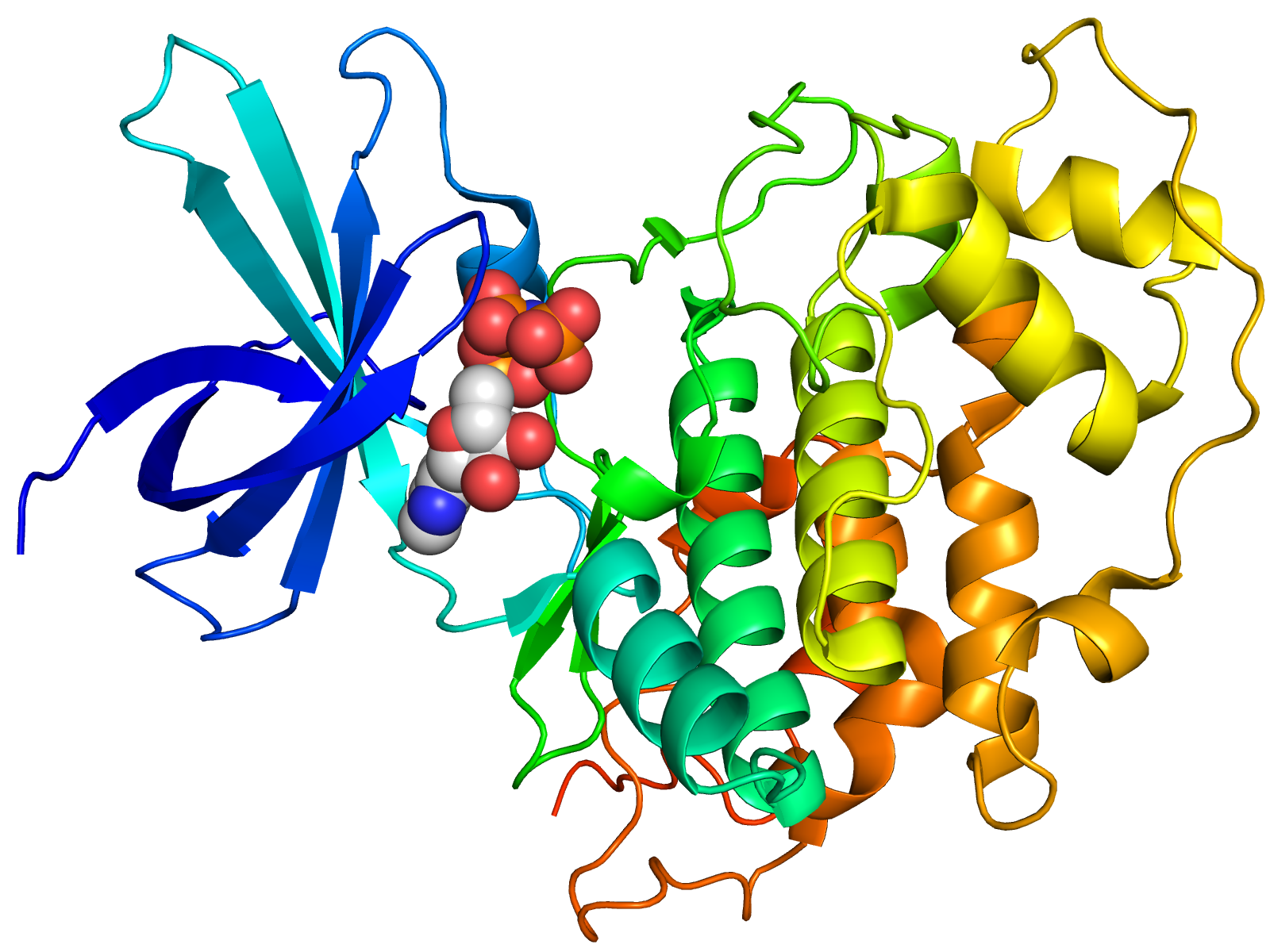
- Crystallographic structure of human GSK-3β (rainbow colored, N-terminus = blue, C-terminus = red) bound to phosphoaminophosphonic acid-adenylate ester (spheres).

Identifiers
- Symbol: GSK3B
- NCBI gene: 2932
- HGNC: 4617
- OMIM: 605004
- PDB: 1Q3W More structures
- RefSeq: NM_002093
- UniProt: P49841

Other data
- EC number: 2.7.11.26
- Locus: Chr. 3 q13.33
Search for
- Structures: Swiss-model
- Domains: InterPro

Glycogen synthase kinase 3 (GSK-3) is a serine/threonine protein kinase that mediates the addition of phosphate molecules onto serine and threonine amino acid residues. First discovered in 1980 as a regulatory kinase for its namesake, glycogen synthase (GS), GSK-3 has since been identified as a protein kinase for over 100 different proteins in a variety of different pathways. In mammals, including humans, GSK-3 exists in two isozymes encoded by two homologous genes GSK-3α (GSK3A) and GSK-3β (GSK3B). GSK-3 has been the subject of much research since it has been implicated in a number of diseases, including type 2 diabetes, Alzheimer's disease, inflammation, cancer, addiction and bipolar disorder.

GSK-3 is a serine/threonine protein kinase that phosphorylate either threonine or serine, and this phosphorylation controls a variety of biological activities, such as glycogen metabolism, cell signaling, cellular transport, and others. GS inhibition by GSK-3β leads to a decrease in glycogen synthesis in the liver and muscles, along with increased blood glucose or hyperglycemia. This is why GSK-3β is associated with the pathogenesis and progression of many diseases, such as diabetes, obesity, cancer, and Alzheimer's disease. It is active in resting cells and is inhibited by several hormones such as insulin, endothelial growth factor, and platelet-derived growth factor. Insulin indirectly inactivates GSK3 via downstream phosphorylation of the specific serine residues Ser21 and Ser9 in GSK-3 isoforms α and β, respectively via the PI3K/Akt pathway.

As of 2019, GSK-3 is the only type of glycogen synthase kinase named and recognized. The gene symbols for GSK1 and GSK2 have been withdrawn by the HUGO Gene Nomenclature Committee (HGNC), and no new names for these "genes" nor their locations have been specified.

== Mechanism ==
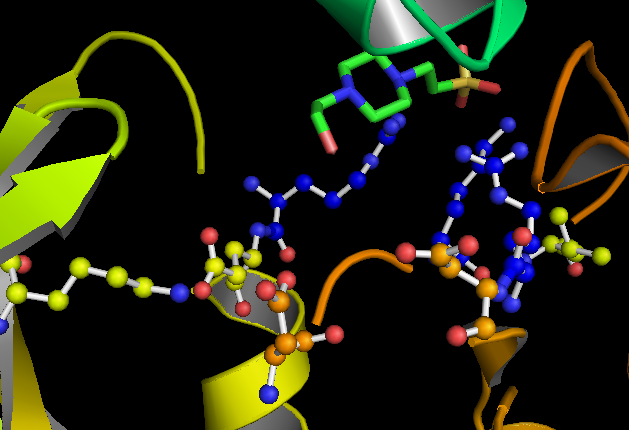
The active site of GSK-3. The three residues in blue bind the priming phosphate on the substrate, as demonstrated by the ligand. Residues D181, D200, K85, and E97.

GSK-3 functions by phosphorylating a serine or threonine residue on its target substrate. A positively charged pocket adjacent to the active site binds a "priming" phosphate group attached to a serine or threonine four residues C-terminal of the target phosphorylation site. The active site, at residues 181, 200, 97, and 85, binds the terminal phosphate of ATP and transfers it to the target location on the substrate (see figure 1).

== Glycogen synthase ==
Glycogen synthase is an enzyme that is responsible in glycogen synthesis. It is activated by glucose 6-phosphate (G6P), and inhibited by glycogen synthase kinases (GSK3). Those two mechanisms play an important role in glycogen metabolism.

== Function ==
Phosphorylation of a protein by GSK-3 usually inhibits the activity of its downstream target. GSK-3 is active in a number of central intracellular signaling pathways, including cellular proliferation, migration, glucose regulation, and apoptosis.

GSK-3 was originally discovered in the context of its involvement in regulating glycogen synthase. After being primed by casein kinase 2 (CK2), glycogen synthase gets phosphorylated at a cluster of three C-terminal serine residues, reducing its activity. In addition to its role in regulating glycogen synthase, GSK-3 has been implicated in other aspects of glucose homeostasis, including the phosphorylation of insulin receptor IRS1 and of the gluconeogenic enzymes phosphoenolpyruvate carboxykinase and glucose 6 phosphatase. However, these interactions have not been confirmed, as these pathways can be inhibited without the up-regulation of GSK-3.

GSK-3 has also been shown to regulate immune and migratory processes. GSK-3 participates in a number of signaling pathways in the innate immune response, including pro-inflammatory cytokine and interleukin production. The inactivation of GSK3B by various protein kinases also affects the adaptive immune response by inducing cytokine production and proliferation in naïve and memory CD4+ T cells. In cellular migration, an integral aspect of inflammatory responses, the inhibition of GSK-3 has been reported to play conflicting roles, as local inhibition at growth cones has been shown to promote motility while global inhibition of cellular GSK-3 has been shown to inhibit cell spreading and migration.

GSK-3 is also integrally tied to pathways of cell proliferation and apoptosis. GSK-3 has been shown to phosphorylate Beta-catenin, thus targeting it for degradation. GSK-3 is therefore a part of the canonical Beta-catenin/Wnt pathway, which signals the cell to divide and proliferate. GSK-3 phosphorylates cyclins D and E, which are important for the transition from G1 to S phase, and causes their degradation. The transcription factors c-myc and c-fos (also S phase promoters ), which are primarily phosphorylated by the dual-specificity tyrosine phosphorylation-regulated kinase, are also phosphorylated by GSK3, causing them to be degraded. GSK-3 also participates in a number of apoptotic signaling pathways by phosphorylating transcription factors that regulate apoptosis. GSK-3 can promote apoptosis by both activating pro-apoptotic factors such as p53 and inactivating survival-promoting factors through phosphorylation. The role of GSK-3 in regulating apoptosis is controversial, however, as some studies have shown that GSK-3β knockout mice are overly sensitized to apoptosis and die in the embryonic stage, while others have shown that overexpression of GSK-3 can induce apoptosis. Overall, GSK-3 appears to both promote and inhibit apoptosis, and this regulation varies depending on the specific molecular and cellular context.

GSK-3 is also involved in nuclear transcriptional activator kappa B (NFκB) signaling pathway, Hedgehog signaling pathway, Notch signaling pathway, and epithelial-mesenchymal transition.

Due to its importance across numerous cellular functions, GSK-3 activity is subject to tight regulation and is considered an "Ace" among kinases.

The speed and efficacy of GSK-3 phosphorylation is regulated by several factors. Phosphorylation of certain GSK-3 residues can increase or decrease its ability to bind substrate. Phosphorylation at tyrosine-216 in GSK-3β or tyrosine-279 in GSK-3α enhances the enzymatic activity of GSK-3, while phosphorylation of autoinhibitory serine-9 in GSK-3β or serine-21 in GSK-3α significantly decreases active site availability (see figure). Further, GSK-3 is unusual among kinases in that it usually requires a "priming kinase" to first phosphorylate a substrate. A phosphorylated serine or threonine residue located four amino acids C-terminal to the target site of phosphorylation allows the substrate to bind a pocket of positive charge formed by arginine and lysine residues.

Depending on the pathway in which it is being utilized, GSK-3 may be further regulated by cellular localization or the formation of protein complexes. The activity of GSK-3 is far greater in the nucleus and mitochondria than in the cytosol in cortical neurons, while the phosphorylation of Beta-catenin by GSK-3 is mediated by the binding of both proteins to Axin, a scaffold protein, allowing Beta-catenin to access the active site of GSK-3.

Insulin indirectly inactivates GSK3 via downstream phosphorylation of the specific serine residues Ser21 and Ser9 in GSK-3 isoforms α and β, respectively, via the PI3K/Akt pathway (protein kinase B).

== Disease relevance ==
Due to its involvement in a great number of signaling pathways, GSK-3 has been associated with a host of high-profile diseases. GSK-3 inhibitors are currently being tested for therapeutic effects in Alzheimer's disease, type 2 diabetes mellitus (T2DM), some forms of cancer, and bipolar disorder.

There is evidence that lithium, which is used as a treatment for bipolar disorder, acts as a mood stabilizer by selectively inhibiting GSK-3. The mechanism through which GSK-3 inhibition may stabilize mood is not known, though it is suspected that the inhibition of GSK-3's ability to promote inflammation contributes to the therapeutic effect. Inhibition of GSK-3 also destabilises Rev-ErbA alpha transcriptional repressor, which has a significant role in the circadian clock. Elements of the circadian clock may be connected with predisposition to bipolar mood disorder.

GSK-3 activity has been associated with both pathological features of Alzheimer's disease, namely the buildup of amyloid-β (Aβ) deposits and the formation of neurofibrillary tangles. GSK-3 is thought to directly promote Aβ production and to be tied to the process of the hyperphosphorylation of tau proteins, which leads to the tangles. Due to these roles of GSK-3 in promoting Alzheimer's disease, GSK-3 inhibitors may have positive therapeutic effects on Alzheimer's patients and are currently in the early stages of testing.

In a similar fashion, targeted inhibition of GSK-3 may have therapeutic effects on certain kinds of cancer. Though GSK-3 has been shown to promote apoptosis in some cases, it has also been reported to be a key factor in tumorigenesis in some cancers. Supporting this claim, GSK-3 inhibitors have been shown to induce apoptosis in glioma and pancreatic cancer cells. GSK-3 also seems to be responsible for NFκB aberrant activity in pediatric acute lymphoblastic leukemia and pancreatic cancer cells. In renal cancer cells, GSK-3 inhibitors induce cell cycle arrest, differentiation of the malignant cells, and autophagy. In contrast to the above neoplasms, high expression of inactive pGSK3β-S9 is found in skin, oral, and lung cancers, suggesting tumor suppressive effects of the enzyme in these cancers. In melanoma, the microRNA miR-769 inhibits GSK-3 activity during the tumor development process, also indicating tumor suppressive effects of GSK3.

GSK-3 inhibitors have also shown promise in the treatment of T2DM. Though GSK-3 activity under diabetic conditions can differ radically across different tissue types, studies have shown that introducing competitive inhibitors of GSK-3 can increase glucose tolerance in diabetic mice. GSK-3 inhibitors may also have therapeutic effects on hemorrhagic transformation after acute ischemic stroke. GSK-3 can negatively regulate the insulin signaling pathway by inhibiting IRS1 via phosphorylation of serine-332, rendering the insulin receptor incapable of activating IRS1 and further initiating the canonical PI3K/Akt pathway. The role that inhibition of GSK-3 might play across its other signaling roles is not yet entirely understood.

GSK-3 inhibition also mediates an increase in the transcription of the transcription factor Tbet (Tbx21) and an inhibition of the transcription of the inhibitory co-receptor programmed cell death-1 (PD-1) on T-cells. GSK-3 inhibitors increased in vivo CD8(+) OT-I CTL function and the clearance of viral infections by murine gamma-herpesvirus 68 and lymphocytic choriomeningitis clone 13 as well as anti-PD-1 in immunotherapy.

== Inhibitors ==
Glycogen synthase kinase inhibitors are different chemotypes and have variable mechanisms of action; they may be cations, from natural sources, synthetic ATP and non-ATP competitive inhibitors and substrate-competitive inhibitors. GSK3 is a bi-lobar architecture with N-terminal and C-terminal, the N-terminal is responsible for ATP binding and C-terminal which is called as activation loop mediates the kinase activity, Tyrosine located at the C-terminal it essential for full GSK3 activity.

=== Benefits of GSK-3β inhibitors ===
In diabetes, GSK-3β inhibitors increase insulin sensitivity, glycogen synthesis, and glucose metabolism in skeletal muscles, and reduce obesity by affecting the adipogenesis process. GSK-3β is also over expressed in several types of cancers, like colorectal, ovarian, and prostate cancer. GSK-3β inhibitors also aid in the treatment of Alzheimer's disease, stroke, and mood disorders, including bipolar disorder. In vitro studies have shown the beneficial effects of GSK-3 inhibitors in lung cancer, ovarian cancer and neuroblastoma.

=== Specific agents ===
Inhibitors of GSK-3 include:

=== Metal cations ===
- Beryllium
- Copper
- Lithium (IC_{50}=2mM)
- Mercury
- Tungsten (Indirect)
- Zinc (IC_{50}=15μM)

=== Atp-competitive ===
==== Marine organism-derived ====
- 6-BIO (IC_{50}=1.5μM)
- Dibromocantharelline (IC_{50}=3μM)
- Hymenialdesine (IC_{50}=10nM)
- Indirubin (IC_{50}=5-50nM)
- Meridianin

==== Aminopyrimidines ====
- CHIR99021 (IC_{50}=6.9nM-10nM)
- CHIR98014 (IC_{50}=0.58-0.65nM)
- CT98014
- CT98023
- CT99021
- TWS119 (IC_{50}=30nM)

==== Arylindolemaleimide ====
- SB-216763 (IC_{50}=34nM)
- SB-41528 (IC_{50}=31-78nM)

==== Thiazoles ====
- AR-A014418 (IC_{50}=104nM)
- AZD-1080 (IC_{50}=6.9nM-31nM)

==== Paullones ====
IC_{50}=4-80nM:

- Alsterpaullone
- Cazpaullone
- Kenpaullone

==== Aloisines ====
IC_{50}=0.5-1.5μM:

=== Non-atp competitive ===
==== Marine organism-derived ====
- Manzamine A (IC_{50}=1.5μM)
- Palinurine (IC_{50}=4.5μM)
- Tricantine (IC_{50}=7.5μM)

==== Thiazolidinediones ====
- TDZD-8 (IC_{50}=2μM)
- NP00111 (IC_{50}=2μM)
- NP031115 (IC_{50}=4μM)
- Tideglusib (IC_{50}=60nM)

==== Halomethylketones ====
- HMK-32 (IC_{50}=1.5μM)

==== Peptides ====
- L803-mts (IC_{50}=20μM)
- L807-mts (IC_{50}=1μM)

==== Unknown mechanism (small-molecule inhibitors) ====
- COB-187 (IC_{50}=11nM-22nM)
- COB-152 (IC_{50}=77nM-132nM)

=== Lithium ===
Lithium which is used in the treatment of bipolar disorder was the first natural GSK-3 inhibitor discovered. It inhibits GSK-3 directly by competition with magnesium ions and indirectly by phosphorylation and auto-regulation of serine. Lithium has been found to have insulin-like effects on glucose metabolism, including stimulation of glycogen synthesis in fat cells, skin, and muscles, increasing glucose uptake, and activation of GS activity. In addition to inhibition of GSK-3, it also inhibits other enzymes involved in the regulation of glucose metabolisms, such as myo-inositol-1-monophosphatase and 1,6 bisphosphatase. Also, it has shown therapeutic benefit in Alzheimer's and other neurodegenerative diseases such as epileptic neurodegeneration.

=== Naproxen and cromolyn ===
Naproxen is a non-steroidal anti-inflammatory drug while cromolyn is an anti-allergic agent which acts as a mast cell stabilizer. Both drugs have demonstrated the anticancer effect in addition to hypoglycemic effect due to inhibition of glycogen synthase kinase-3β (GSK-3β).

To validate the anti-GSK-3β hypothesis of naproxen and cromolyn, docking of the two structures against GSK-3β binding pocket and comparing their fitting with known GSK-3β inhibitor ARA014418 was performed, in addition to measuring the serum glucose, serum insulin, serum C-peptide, weight variation and hepatic glycogen levels for normal and diabetic fasting animal's models to assess their in vitro hypoglycemic effects.

Naproxen and cromolyn were successfully docked into the binding site of GSK-3β (both were fitted into its binding pocket). They exhibited electrostatic, hydrophobic, and hydrogen-bonding interactions with key amino acids within the binding pocket with binding interaction profiles similar to AR-A014418 (the known inhibitor). The negative charges of the carboxylic acid groups in both drugs interact electrostatically with the positively charged guanidine group of Arg141. Moreover, the hydrogen bonding interactions between carboxylic acid moieties of cromolyn and the ammonium groups of Lys183 and Lys60, in addition to π-stacking of the naphthalene ring system of naproxen with the phenolic ring of Tyr134.

Antidiabetic effects of naproxen and cromolyn: In normal animal models, both drugs have shown dose-dependent reduction in blood glucose levels and rise in glycogen levels. In chronic type II diabetic model, glucose levels were also reduced, and glycogen level and insulin levels were elevated in a dose-dependent manner with a reduction in plasma glucose.

Anti-obesity effects of naproxen and cromolyn: Both drugs showed significant anti-obesity effects as they reduce body weight, resistin, and glucose levels in a dose-dependent manner. They were also found to elevate adiponectin, insulin, and C-peptide levels in a dose-dependent manner.

=== Famotidine ===
Famotidine is a specific, long-acting H2 antagonist that decreases gastric acid secretion. It is used in the treatment of peptic ulcer disease, GERD, and pathological hypersecretory conditions, like Zollinger–Ellison syndrome. (14,15) H2-receptor antagonists affect hormone metabolism, but their effect on glucose metabolism is not well established. (16) A study has revealed a glucose-lowering effect for famotidine.

The study of famotidine binding to the enzyme has showed that famotidine can be docked within the binding pocket of GSK-3β making significant interactions with key points within the GSK-3β binding pocket. Strong hydrogen bond interactions with the key amino acids PRO-136 and VAL -135 and potential hydrophobic interaction with LEU-188 were similar to those found in the ligand binding to the enzyme (AR-A014418).

Furthermore, famotidine showed high GSK-3β binding affinity and inhibitory activity due to interactions that stabilize the complex, namely hydrogen bonding of guanidine group in famotidine with the sulfahydryl moiety in CYS-199; and electrostatic interactions between the same guanidine group with the carboxyl group in ASP-200, the hydrogen bond between the terminal NH2 group, the OH of the TYR-143, and the hydrophobic interaction of the sulfur atom in the thioether with ILE-62. In vitro studies showed that famotidine inhibits GSK-3β activity and increases liver glycogen reserves in a dose dependent manner. A fourfold increase in the liver glycogen level with the use of the highest dose of famotidine (4.4 mg/kg) was observed. Also, famotidine has been shown to decrease serum glucose levels 30, and 60 minutes after oral glucose load in healthy individuals. As a GSK-3β inhibitor, the IC_{50} value of famotidine is 1.44μM.

=== Curcumin ===
Curcumin, which Is a constituent of turmeric spice, has flavoring and coloring properties. It has two symmetrical forms: enol (the most abundant forms) and ketone.

Curcumin has wide pharmacological activities: anti-inflammatory, anti-microbial, hypoglycemic, anti-oxidant, and wound healing effects. In animal models with Alzheimer disease, it has anti-destructive effect of beta amyloid in the brain, and recently it shows anti-malarial activity.

Curcumin also has chemo preventative and anti-cancer effects, and it has been shown to attenuate oxidative stress and renal dysfunction in diabetic animals with chronic use.

Curcumin's mechanism of action is anti-inflammatory; it inhibits the nuclear transcriptional activator kappa B (NF-KB) that is activated whenever there is inflammatory response.

NF-kB has two regulatory factors, IkB and GSK-3, which suggests curcumin directly binds and inhibits GSK-3B. An in vitro study confirmed GSK-3B inhibition by simulating molecular docking using a silico docking technique. The concentration at which 50% of GK-3B would be inhibited by curcumin is 66.3 nM.

Among its two forms, experimental and theoretical studies show that the enol form is the favored form due to its intra-molecular hydrogen bonding, and an NMR experiment show that enol form exist in a variety of solvents.

=== Olanzapine ===
Antipsychotic medications are increasingly used for schizophrenia, bipolar disorder, anxiety, and other psychiatric conditions Atypical antipsychotics are more commonly used than first generation antipsychotics because they decrease the risk of extrapyramidal symptoms, such as tardive dyskinesia, and have better efficacy.

Olanzapine and atypical antipsychotics induce weight gain through increasing body fat. It also affects glucose metabolism, and several studies shows that it may worsen diabetes.

A recent study shows that olanzapine inhibits GSK3 activity, suggesting olanzapine permits glycogen synthesis. A study of the effect of olanzapine on mouse blood glucose and glycogen levels showed a significant decrease in blood glucose level and elevation of glycogen level in mice, and the IC50% of olanzapine were 91.0 nm, which is considered a potent inhibitor. The study also illustrates that sub-chronic use of olanzapine results in potent inhibition of GSK3.

=== Pyrimidine derivatives ===
Pyrimidine analogues are antimetabolites that interfere with nucleic acid synthesis. Some of them have been shown to fit the ATP-binding pocket of GSK-3β to lower blood glucose levels and improve some neuronal diseases.

== See also ==
- Ketamine
- Tau-protein kinase
