= Tau-protein kinase =

Class of enzymes

tau-protein kinase
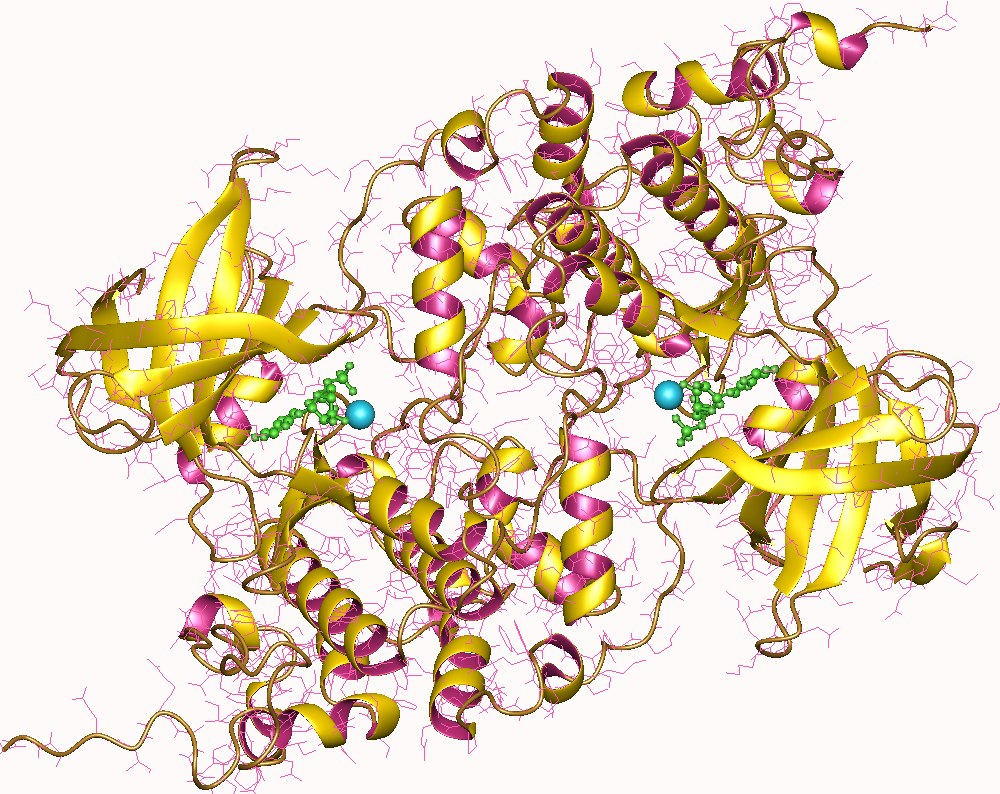

Identifiers
- EC no.: 2.7.11.26
- CAS no.: 111694-09-8

Databases
- IntEnz: IntEnz view
- BRENDA: BRENDA entry
- ExPASy: NiceZyme view
- KEGG: KEGG entry
- MetaCyc: metabolic pathway
- PRIAM: profile
- PDB structures: RCSB PDB PDBe PDBsum
- Gene Ontology: AmiGO / QuickGO
Search
- PMC: articles
- PubMed: articles
- NCBI: proteins

In enzymology, a tau-protein kinase (EC 2.7.11.26) is an enzyme that catalyzes the chemical reaction

ATP + tau protein $\rightleftharpoons$ ADP + O-phospho-tau-protein

Thus, the two substrates of this enzyme are ATP and tau protein, whereas its two products are ADP and O-phospho-tau-protein.

This enzyme belongs to the family of transferases, specifically, those transferring a phosphate group to the sidechain oxygen atom of serine or threonine residues in proteins (protein-serine/threonine kinases). This enzyme participates in 14 metabolic pathways: erbb signaling pathway, cell cycle, wnt signaling pathway, hedgehog signaling pathway, axon guidance, focal adhesion, b cell receptor signaling pathway, insulin signaling pathway, melanogenesis, alzheimer's disease, colorectal cancer, endometrial cancer, prostate cancer, and basal cell carcinoma.

== Nomenclature ==
The systematic name of this enzyme class is ATP:[tau-protein] O-phosphotransferase. Other names in common use include ATP:tau-protein O-hosphotransferase, brain protein kinase PK40erk, cdk5/p20, CDK5/p23, glycogen synthase kinase-3beta, GSK, protein tau kinase, STK31, tau kinase, [tau-protein] kinase, tau-protein kinase I, tau-protein kinase II, tau-tubulin kinase, TPK, TPK I, TPK II, and TTK.

== Structural studies ==
As of late 2007, 3 structures have been solved for this class of enzymes, with PDB accession codes 2JDO, 2JDR, and 2UW9.

== Examples ==
Human genes encoding proteins with Tau-protein kinase activity include:

- BRSK1
- BRSK2
- GSK3A
- GSK3B
