= TGF beta receptor 1 =

Protein-coding gene in the species Homo sapiens

TGFBR1
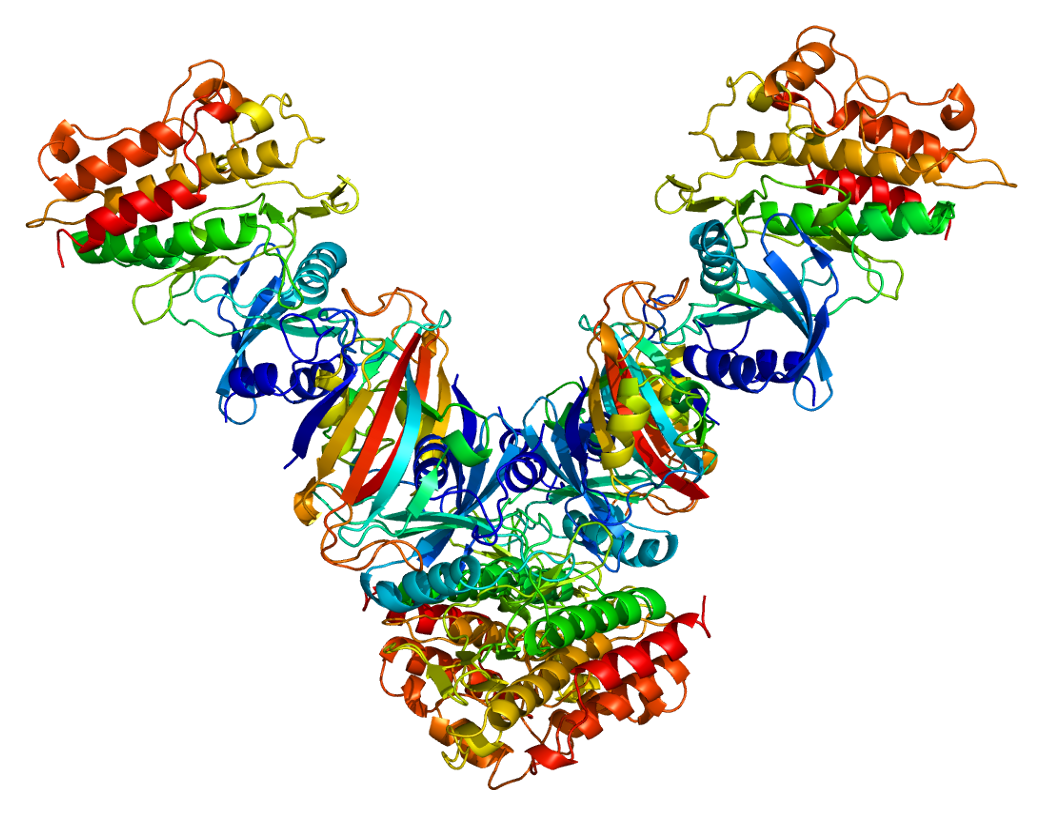

Identifiers
- Aliases: TGFBR1, AAT5, ACVRLK4, ALK-5, ALK5, ESS1, LDS1, LDS1A, LDS2A, MSSE, SKR4, TGFR-1, tbetaR-I, transforming growth factor beta receptor 1, TBRI, TBR-i
- External IDs: OMIM: 190181; MGI: 98728; GeneCards: TGFBR1
Available structures
| PDB | Ortholog search: PDBe RCSB |
| PDB | List of PDB id codes 1B6C, 1IAS, 1PY5, 1RW8, 1VJY, 2L5S, 2PJY, 2WOT, 2WOU, 2X7O, 3FAA, 3GXL, 3HMM, 3KCF, 3KFD, 3TZM, 4X0M, 4X2J, 4X2K, 4X2N, 4X2G, 4X2F, 5E8W, 5E8X, 5E8U, 5E8T, 5E8S, 5E90, 5E8Z |
Enzyme activity
| EC # | BRENDA | ExPASy | KEGG | MetaCyc |
|---|---|---|---|---|
| 2.7.11.30 | ↗ | ↗ | ↗ | ↗ |

Gene location (Human)
| Chr. | Chromosome 9 (human) |
| Band | 9q22.33 | Start | 99,104,038 bp |
| Band | 9q22.33 | End | 99,154,192 bp |

Gene location (Mouse)
| Chr. | Chromosome 4 (mouse) |
| Band | 4 B1|4 26.02 cM | Start | 47,353,222 bp |
| Band | 4 B1|4 26.02 cM | End | 47,414,931 bp |
RNA expression pattern
| Bgee | Human / Mouse (ortholog); Top expressed in: saphenous vein; tibia; visceral pleura; Achilles tendon; synovial joint; lactiferous duct; ventricular zone; mucosa of paranasal sinus; ganglionic eminence; superficial temporal artery / Top expressed in: medullary collecting duct; superior cervical ganglion; cumulus cell; medial ganglionic eminence; mandibular prominence; efferent ductule; abdominal wall; tunica media of zone of aorta; maxillary prominence; molar; More reference expression data |
| BioGPS | n/a |
Gene ontology
| Molecular function | type II transforming growth factor beta receptor binding; I-SMAD binding; transforming growth factor beta-activated receptor activity; kinase activity; signaling receptor binding; ATP binding; protein kinase activity; metal ion binding; protein serine/threonine kinase activity; transforming growth factor beta receptor activity, type I; transferase activity; growth factor binding; transmembrane receptor protein serine/threonine kinase activity; protein binding; SMAD binding; nucleotide binding; transforming growth factor beta binding; activin binding |
| Cellular component | endosome; membrane; bicellular tight junction; cell surface; membrane raft; integral component of membrane; receptor complex; plasma membrane; cell junction; intracellular anatomical structure; intracellular membrane-bounded organelle; integral component of plasma membrane; activin receptor complex; nucleus |
| Biological process | skeletal system development; response to cholesterol; regulation of protein ubiquitination; post-embryonic development; protein phosphorylation; negative regulation of chondrocyte differentiation; mesenchymal cell differentiation; angiogenesis; transforming growth factor beta receptor signaling pathway; positive regulation of filopodium assembly; extracellular structure organization; pharyngeal system development; apoptotic process; cellular response to transforming growth factor beta stimulus; pathway-restricted SMAD protein phosphorylation; positive regulation of protein kinase B signaling; regulation of transcription, DNA-templated; kidney development; collagen fibril organization; thymus development; cell motility; negative regulation of extrinsic apoptotic signaling pathway; positive regulation of apoptotic signaling pathway; in utero embryonic development; negative regulation of transforming growth factor beta receptor signaling pathway; positive regulation of transcription, DNA-templated; development of the heart; positive regulation of cell growth; parathyroid gland development; artery morphogenesis; blastocyst development; activin receptor signaling pathway; roof of mouth development; cell differentiation; male gonad development; phosphorylation; skeletal system morphogenesis; wound healing; negative regulation of apoptotic process; epithelial to mesenchymal transition; regulation of gene expression; embryonic cranial skeleton morphogenesis; peptidyl-threonine phosphorylation; intracellular signal transduction; positive regulation of endothelial cell proliferation; positive regulation of cell migration; regulation of epithelial to mesenchymal transition; positive regulation of pathway-restricted SMAD protein phosphorylation; endothelial cell activation; negative regulation of endothelial cell proliferation; transmembrane receptor protein serine/threonine kinase signaling pathway; lens development in camera-type eye; peptidyl-serine phosphorylation; positive regulation of cell population proliferation; regulation of growth; neuron fate commitment; regulation of protein binding; endothelial cell migration; germ cell migration; positive regulation of SMAD protein signal transduction; cardiac epithelial to mesenchymal transition; signal transduction; anterior/posterior pattern specification; proepicardium development; ventricular trabecula myocardium morphogenesis; ventricular compact myocardium morphogenesis; positive regulation of epithelial to mesenchymal transition; protein deubiquitination; positive regulation of stress fiber assembly; regulation of cardiac muscle cell proliferation; ventricular septum morphogenesis; angiogenesis involved in coronary vascular morphogenesis; coronary artery morphogenesis; positive regulation of epithelial to mesenchymal transition involved in endocardial cushion formation; positive regulation of tight junction disassembly; epicardium morphogenesis; positive regulation of apoptotic process; positive regulation of gene expression; pattern specification process |
Sources:Amigo / QuickGO
Orthologs
| Databases | NCBI: entry; OMA: entry |
| Species | Human | Mouse |
| Entrez | 7046 | 21812 |
| Ensembl | ENSG00000106799 | ENSMUSG00000007613 |
| UniProt | P36897 | Q64729 |
| RefSeq (mRNA) | NM_001130916; NM_001306210; NM_004612 | NM_009370; NM_001312868; NM_001312869 |
| RefSeq (protein) | NP_001124388; NP_001293139; NP_004603 | NP_001299797; NP_001299798; NP_033396 |
| Location (UCSC) | Chr 9: 99.1 – 99.15 Mb | Chr 4: 47.35 – 47.41 Mb |
| PubMed search |
- Wikidata
| View/Edit Human | View/Edit Mouse |

Transforming growth factor beta receptor I (activin A receptor type II-like kinase, 53kDa) is a membrane-bound TGF beta receptor protein of the TGF-beta receptor family for the TGF beta superfamily of signaling ligands. TGFBR1 is its human gene.

== Function ==
The protein encoded by this gene forms a heteromeric complex with type II TGF-β receptors when bound to TGF-β, transducing the TGF-β signal from the cell surface to the cytoplasm. The encoded protein is a serine/threonine protein kinase. Mutations in this gene have been associated with Loeys–Dietz aortic aneurysm syndrome (LDS, LDAS).

== Interactions ==
TGF beta receptor 1 has been shown to interact with:

- Caveolin 1,
- Endoglin,
- FKBP1A,
- FNTA,
- Heat shock protein 90kDa alpha (cytosolic), member A1
- Mothers against decapentaplegic homolog 7,
- PPP2R2A,
- STRAP,
- TGF beta 1, and
- TGF beta receptor 2.

== Inhibitors ==
- GW-788388
- LY-2109761
- Galunisertib (LY-2157299)
- SB-431542
- SB-525334
- RepSox
- Ontunisertib

== Animal studies ==
Defects are observed when the TGFBR-1 gene is either knocked-out or when a constitutively active TGFBR-1 mutant (that is active in the presence or absence of ligand) is knocked-in.

In mouse TGFBR-1 knock-out models, the female mice were sterile. They developed oviductal diverticula and defective uterine smooth muscle, meaning that uterine smooth muscle layers were poorly formed. Oviductal diverticula are small, bulging pouches located on the oviduct, which is the tube that transports the ovum from the ovary to the uterus. This deformity of the oviduct occurred bilaterally and resulted in impaired embryo development and impaired transit of the embryos to the uterus. Ovulation and fertilization still occurred in the knock-outs, however remnants of embryos were found in these oviductal diverticula.

In mouse TGFBR-1 knock-in models where a constitutively active TGFBR-1 gene is conditionally induced, the over-activation of the TGFBR-1 receptors lead to infertility, a reduction in the number of uterine glands, and hypermuscled uteri (an increased amount of smooth muscle in the uteri).

Research into how turning off the TGFBR-1 gene affects spinal cord development in mice led to the discovery that, when the gene is turned off, external genitalia instead form as two hind legs.

These experiments show that the TGFB-1 receptor plays a critical role in the function of the female reproductive tract. They also show that genetic mutations in the TGFBR-1 gene may lead to fertility issues in women.
