= STRAP =

Protein-coding gene in the species Homo sapiens

Identifiers
- Aliases: STRAP, MAWD, PT-WD, UNRIP, serine/threonine kinase receptor associated protein
- External IDs: OMIM: 605986; MGI: 1329037; GeneCards: STRAP

Gene location (Human)
Chr.	Chromosome 12 (human)
Band	12p12.3	Start	15,882,387 bp
Band	12p12.3	End	15,903,478 bp

Gene location (Mouse)
Chr.	Chromosome 6 (mouse)
Band	6|6 G1	Start	137,712,076 bp
Band	6|6 G1	End	137,728,930 bp
RNA expression pattern
Bgee	Human / Mouse (ortholog); Top expressed in: secondary oocyte; corpus epididymis; pons; tail of epididymis; beta cell; caput epididymis; anterior pituitary; embryo; ventricular zone; ganglionic eminence / Top expressed in: mandibular prominence; maxillary prominence; somite; seminiferous tubule; cumulus cell; abdominal wall; epiblast; primitive streak; hair follicle; ventricular zone; More reference expression data
BioGPS	n/a
Gene ontology
Molecular function	signaling receptor binding; protein binding; RNA binding
Cellular component	cytoplasm; SMN complex; SMN-Sm protein complex; cytosol; nucleus; nucleoplasm
Biological process	mRNA processing; negative regulation of transcription by RNA polymerase II; negative regulation of epithelial cell migration; maintenance of gastrointestinal epithelium; negative regulation of transforming growth factor beta receptor signaling pathway; negative regulation of epithelial to mesenchymal transition; negative regulation of pathway-restricted SMAD protein phosphorylation; RNA splicing; negative regulation of epithelial cell proliferation; spliceosomal snRNP assembly
Sources:Amigo / QuickGO
Orthologs
Databases	NCBI: entry; OMA: entry
Species	Human	Mouse
Entrez	11171	20901
Ensembl	ENSG00000023734	ENSMUSG00000030224
UniProt	Q9Y3F4	Q9Z1Z2
RefSeq (mRNA)	NM_007178	NM_011499
RefSeq (protein)	NP_009109	NP_035629
Location (UCSC)	Chr 12: 15.88 – 15.9 Mb	Chr 6: 137.71 – 137.73 Mb
PubMed search
- Wikidata
View/Edit Human	View/Edit Mouse

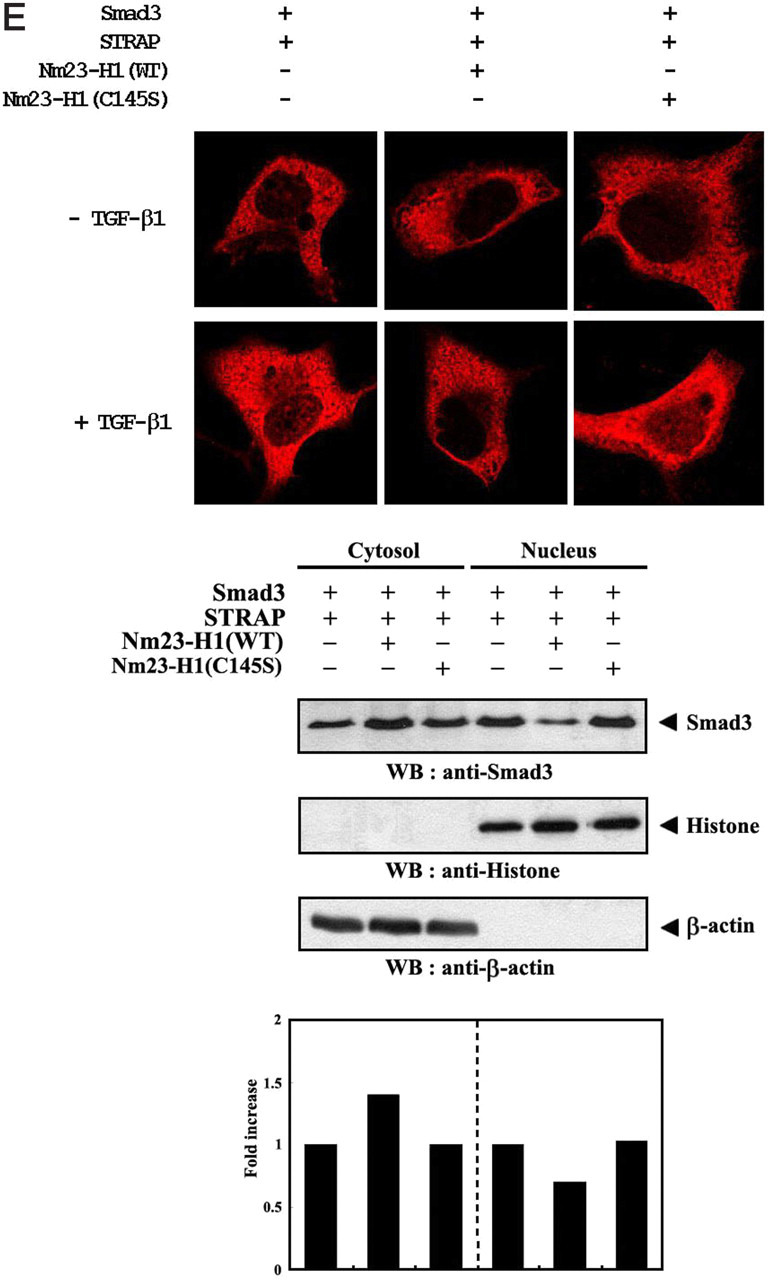
The figure illustrates the inhibitory effect of NM23-H1 on Smad3 nuclear translocation in the TGF-β signaling pathway. Panels A and B show NM23-H1's impact on the association of activated TGF-β receptor with Smad7 and STRAP, respectively. Panels C and D demonstrate NM23-H1's modulation of Smad3 localization in Hep3B cells. Panel E extends this analysis with NM23-H1(C145S). Quantitative analysis, using densitometry, shows the relative Smad3 expression levels compared to controls. These experiments collectively highlight NM23-H1's role in regulating Smad3 and its association with TGF-β signaling components. The data are representative of multiple independent experiments.

Serine-threonine kinase receptor-associated protein is an protein that in humans is encoded by the STRAP gene.

== Structure ==
STRAP is a 38.5 kDa, 350-amino acid protein belonging to the WD40 repeat protein family. It contains seven WD40 repeats that fold into a seven-bladed β-propeller structure that spans almost the entire length of the protein. The N-terminal WD40 repeats binds to TGF-β receptor I, whereas the C-terminal region is phosphorylated by TGF-β receptor II.

== Function ==
STRAP is a WD40-repeat protein that binds both the type I and type II TGF-β receptors. Its primary function is to recruit and stabilize the inhibitory Smad, SMAD7, at the activated TGF-β receptor complex.

By stabilizing this STRAP/SMAD7/TGF-β receptor complex, STRAP sterically blocks SMAD2 and SMAD3 from binding to the activated type I TGF-β receptor, preventing its phosphorylation and thus blunting TGF-β mediated up-regulation of gene expression.

== Apoptosis ==
STRAP binds directly to ASK1 through ASK1's C-terminal domain and the fourth and sixth WD40 repeats of STRAP. This binding allows STRAP to be phosphorylated by ASK1, and the resulting complex reduces ASK1's downstream signaling to the JNK and p38 stress-response pathways. It does so by helping to stabilize ASK1's association with its own inhibitory proteins, thioredoxin and 14-3-3. It also reduces ASK1's ability to form a complex with its downstream target MKK3. Through this mechanism, STRAP protects cells from H_{2}O_{2}-induced, ASK1-driven apoptosis, favoring cell survival. STRAP has also been described as a positive regulator of PDK1 signaling.

== Clinical significance ==
STRAP is a component of the survival motor neuron (SMN) complex, binding to it through an interaction with GEMIN7. Loss of the complex's core protein, SMN, causes spinal muscular atrophy, a childhood disorder characterized by motor neuron degeneration.

STRAP also inhibits TGF-β receptor signaling by stabilizing the inhibitory protein SMAD7, which in turn limits activation of SMAD2 and SMAD3. This pathway is frequently dysregulated in cancer and elevated STRAP expression has been reported in several tumor types, including colorectal and lung carcinoma, where it promotes proliferation and reduces apoptosis.

== Interactions ==
STRAP has been shown to interact with:

- Mothers against decapentaplegic homolog 2,
- Mothers against decapentaplegic homolog 3,
- Mothers against decapentaplegic homolog 6,
- Mothers against decapentaplegic homolog 7,
- TGF beta receptor 1, and
- TGF beta receptor 2.
