= RepSox =

Chemical compound

Clinical data
- Routes of administration: Oral
- ATC code: none

Legal status
- Legal status: In general: unscheduled

Identifiers
- IUPAC name: 2-[5-(6-methylpyridin-2-yl)-1H-pyrazol-4-yl]-1,5-naphthyridine
- CAS Number: 446859-33-2
- PubChem CID: 449054
- ChemSpider: 395681
- UNII: JT8ZW3H2ST
- ChEBI: CHEBI:190969
- ChEMBL: ChEMBL185238
- CompTox Dashboard (EPA): DTXSID80332295
- ECHA InfoCard: 100.190.188

Chemical and physical data
- Formula: C_{17}H_{13}N_{5}
- Molar mass: 287.326 g·mol^{−1}
- 3D model (JSmol): Interactive image
- SMILES: CC1=NC(=CC=C1)C2=C(C=NN2)C3=NC4=C(C=C3)N=CC=C4
- InChI: InChI=InChI=1S/C17H13N5/c1-11-4-2-5-16(20-11)17-12(10-19-22-17)13-7-8-14-15(21-13)6-3-9-18-14/h2-10H,1H3,(H,19,22); Key:LBPKYPYHDKKRFS-UHFFFAOYSA-N

RepSox is a small molecule inhibitor of TGFβR1, also known as ALK5. As a mimetic of the effects of the SOX2 protein, it has gained attention in the fields of stem cell research and regenerative medicine.

It was identified after the discovery of the Yamanaka factors. It has shown promise in a variety of in-vitro and in-vivo rodent trials modelling various diseases. It inhibits TGFβR1 autophosphorylation by preventing the protein from binding with ATP, inhibits the binding of TGF-β to TGFβR1, and prevents the transcription of genes activated by TGFβR1 with nanomolar potency. RepSox is a member of the 1,5-naphthyridine class.

== Research ==
In an in-vivo trial of rats with ovariectomy-induced osteoporosis, RepSox was shown to prevent bone loss. RepSox is included as a part of some chemical cocktails intended for cellular reprogramming and anti-aging, where it works by inducing the expression of the gene Nanog.

RepSox suppresses the proliferation of osteosarcoma cells via suppression of the JNK/Smad3 signalling pathway, and was able to induce cell cycle arrest, promote apoptosis and prevent migration of the cancer cells. The results were replicated both in-vitro and in-vivo.

RepSox was able to promote the transformation of glial cells to neurons in the enteric nervous system of adult mice, consequently influencing gastrointestinal motility, and underlining a potential therapeutic use of RepSox in enteric neuropathies.

== History ==
RepSox was discovered by a team at the Harvard Stem Cell Institute looking for way to induce pluripotency without inserting the gene Sox2 into cells. They discovered a molecule which was capable of this but also was able to reprogram cells in the absence of c-Myc, a tumour promoting gene. They named the molecule RepSox since it can replace Sox2 and in homage to the Boston Red Sox.
