= Ziad Mallat =

Academic background
- Education: MD, Cardiovascular Diseases, 1996, Pierre and Marie Curie University; PhD, Vascular Biology, Thrombosis and Haemostasis, 1999, Paris Diderot University
- Thesis: MISE EN EVIDENCE D'UNE MORT CELLULAIRE PROGRAMMEE (APOPTOSE) DU MYOCYTE CARDIAQUE DANS LA DYSPLASIE VENTRICULAIRE DROITE ARYTHMOGENE (DES PATHOLOGIE CARDIOVASCULAIRE) (1996)

Academic work
- Institutions: University of Cambridge; Inserm
- Main interests: atherosclerosis inflammasome vascular aneurysms

Ziad Mallat is a French cardiologist. As a professor of Cardiology at the University of Cambridge, Mallat was the first to identify a major atheroprotective role of regulatory T cells and associated anti-inflammatory cytokines, IL-10 and TGF-β.

== Early life and education ==
Mallat received his medical degree and qualification in cardiovascular diseases from Pierre and Marie Curie University in 1996 and his Ph.D. in Vascular Biology, Thrombosis and Haemostasis from Paris Diderot University in 1999.

== Career ==
Mallat was the first to identify a major atheroprotective role of regulatory T cells and associated anti-inflammatory cytokines, IL-10 and TGF-β. Later, he identified selective pathogenic and protective roles for defined B cell and innate lymphoid cell subsets in atherosclerosis and cardiac remodeling following ischemic injury.

During the COVID-19 pandemic, Mallat's research team was shortlisted by the British Heart Foundation for their £30m research prize for his project iMAP. The aim of his proposal was to create a "Google map" of human atherosclerosis. On May 13, 2020, Mallat was one of six faculty members elected to the Academy of Medical Sciences. He was elected for having made "sustained and internationally recognised contributions to our understanding of cardiovascular immunology and atherosclerotic disease and translated these novel findings into clinical trials."
