= LDN193189 =

Names
- Preferred IUPAC name 4-{6-[4-(Piperazin-1-yl)phenyl]pyrazolo[1,5-a]pyrimidin-3-yl}quinoline

Identifiers
CAS Number	1062368-24-4
3D model (JSmol)	Interactive image
ChEBI	CHEBI:91387
ChEMBL	ChEMBL513147
ChemSpider	24715454
DrugBank	DB18051
PubChem CID	25195294
UNII	W69H5YQU9O
CompTox Dashboard (EPA)	DTXSID30147553
- InChI: InChI=1S/C25H22N6/c1-2-4-24-22(3-1)21(9-10-27-24)23-16-29-31-17-19(15-28-25(23)31)18-5-7-20(8-6-18)30-13-11-26-12-14-30/h1-10,15-17,26H,11-14H2 Key: CDOVNWNANFFLFJ-UHFFFAOYSA-N
- SMILES: C1(C2=C3N=CC(C4=CC=C(N5CCNCC5)C=C4)=CN3N=C2)=CC=NC6=CC=CC=C16

Properties
Chemical formula	C_{25}H_{22}N_{6}
Molar mass	406.493 g·mol^{−1}
- Except where otherwise noted, data are given for materials in their standard state (at 25 °C [77 °F], 100 kPa). Infobox references

LDN193189 is a chemical compound and receptor antagonist used in the study of bone morphogenetic protein signalling through the ALK2, ALK3 and ALK6 receptors. It has been researched for the treatment of fibrodysplasia ossificans progressiva.

== See also ==
- SB-431542
