= CHIR99021 =

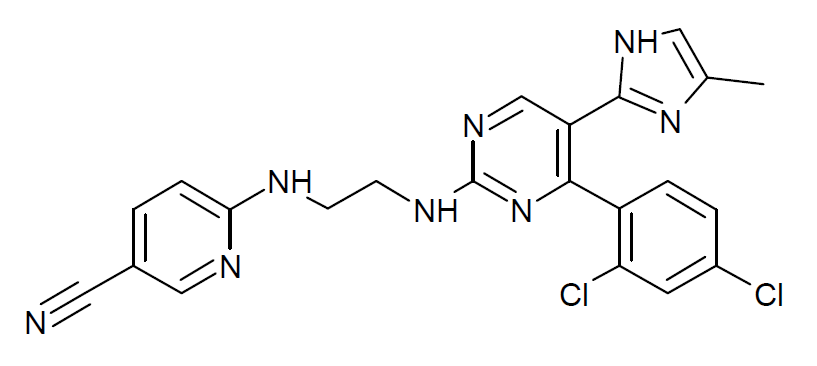

Names
- IUPAC name 6-((2-((4-(2,4-Dichlorophenyl)-5-(4-methyl-1H-imidazol-2-yl)pyrimidin-2-yl)amino)ethyl)amino)nicotinonitrile
- Other names Laduviglusib

Identifiers
CAS Number	252917-06-9
3D model (JSmol)	Interactive image
ChEBI	CHEBI:91091
ChEMBL	ChEMBL412142
ChemSpider	8131728
ECHA InfoCard	100.236.922
EC Number	809-015-4
IUPHAR/BPS	8014
KEGG	D12196
PubChem CID	9956119
UNII	234CMT4GK4
CompTox Dashboard (EPA)	DTXSID90179931
- InChI: InChI=1S/C22H18Cl2N8/c1-13-10-29-21(31-13)17-12-30-22(32-20(17)16-4-3-15(23)8-18(16)24)27-7-6-26-19-5-2-14(9-25)11-28-19/h2-5,8,10-12H,6-7H2,1H3,(H,26,28)(H,29,31)(H,27,30,32) Key: AQGNHMOJWBZFQQ-UHFFFAOYSA-N
- SMILES: N#CC1=CN=C(NCCNC2=NC=C(C3=NC(C)=CN3)C(C4=CC=C(Cl)C=C4Cl)=N2)C=C1

Properties
Chemical formula	C_{22}H_{18}Cl_{2}N_{8}
Molar mass	465.34 g·mol^{−1}
- Except where otherwise noted, data are given for materials in their standard state (at 25 °C [77 °F], 100 kPa). Infobox references

CHIR99021 is a chemical compound which acts as an inhibitor of the enzyme GSK-3. It has proved useful for applications in molecular biology involving the transformation of one cell type to another.

A mixture of CHIR99021 and valproic acid (FX-322) is claimed to increase the proliferation of inner ear stem cells, potentially allowing regrowth of the hair cells which are important for hearing, and are lost through chronic exposure to loud noises or as part of the aging process.

The substance has been used as part of a chemical cocktail to turn old and senescent human cells back into young ones (as measured by transcriptomic age), without turning them all the way back into undifferentiated stem cells.

== See also ==
- SB-431542
