= Glycogen synthase kinase-3 beta =

Protein-coding gene in Homo sapiens

GSK3B
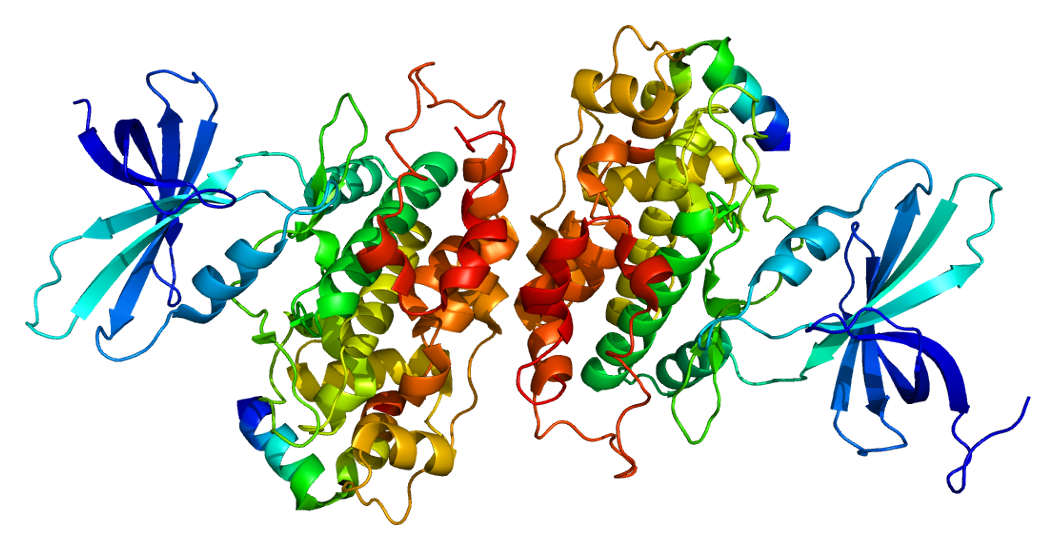

Identifiers
- Aliases: GSK3B, Gsk3b, 7330414F15Rik, 8430431H08Rik, C86142, GSK-3, GSK-3beta, GSK3, glycogen synthase kinase 3 beta
- External IDs: OMIM: 605004; MGI: 1861437; GeneCards: GSK3B
Available structures
PDB	Ortholog search: PDBe RCSB
PDB	List of PDB id codes 1GNG, 1H8F, 1I09, 1J1B, 1J1C, 1O6K, 1O6L, 1O9U, 1PYX, 1Q3D, 1Q3W, 1Q41, 1Q4L, 1Q5K, 1R0E, 1UV5, 2JDO, 2JDR, 2JLD, 2O5K, 2OW3, 2UW9, 2X39, 2XH5, 3CQU, 3CQW, 3DU8, 3E87, 3E88, 3E8D, 3F7Z, 3F88, 3GB2, 3I4B, 3L1S, 3M1S, 3MV5, 3OW4, 3PUP, 3Q3B, 3QKK, 3SAY, 3SD0, 3ZDI, 3ZRK, 3ZRL, 3ZRM, 4ACC, 4ACD, 4ACG, 4ACH, 4AFJ, 4B7T, 4DIT, 4EKK, 4IQ6, 4J1R, 4J71, 4NM0, 4NM3, 4NM5, 4NM7, 4PTC, 4PTE, 4PTG, 5F94, 5F95, 5HLP, 5HLN
Enzyme activity
EC #	BRENDA	ExPASy	KEGG	MetaCyc
2.7.11.1	↗	↗	↗	↗
2.7.11.26	↗	↗	↗	↗

Gene location (Human)
Chr.	Chromosome 3 (human)
Band	3q13.33	Start	119,821,321 bp
Band	3q13.33	End	120,094,994 bp

Gene location (Mouse)
Chr.	Chromosome 16 (mouse)
Band	16|16 B3	Start	37,909,363 bp
Band	16|16 B3	End	38,066,446 bp
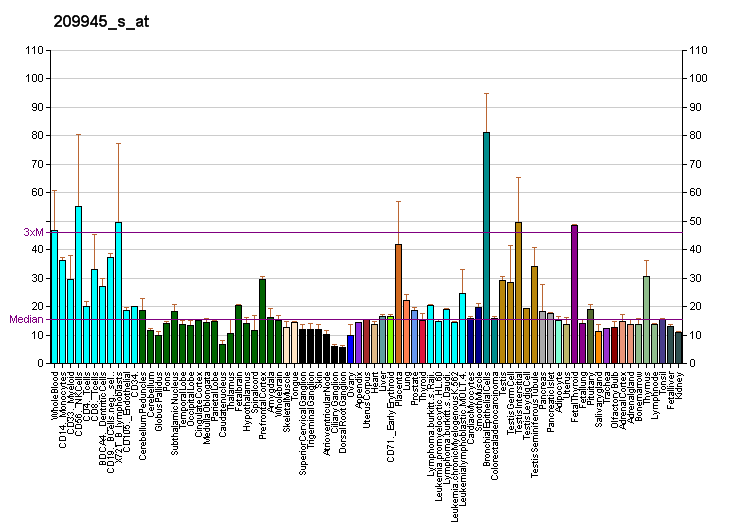
RNA expression pattern
Bgee	Human / Mouse (ortholog); Top expressed in: Achilles tendon; epithelium of colon; sural nerve; buccal mucosa cell; skin of thigh; ventricular zone; ganglionic eminence; postcentral gyrus; left testis; right testis / Top expressed in: spermatid; cumulus cell; ventromedial nucleus; lateral septal nucleus; lateral hypothalamus; mammillary body; retinal pigment epithelium; Rostral migratory stream; lateral geniculate nucleus; Region I of hippocampus proper; More reference expression data
BioGPS	More reference expression data
Gene ontology
Molecular function	kinase activity; ATP binding; protein kinase activity; protein kinase A catalytic subunit binding; protein serine/threonine kinase activity; transferase activity; NF-kappaB binding; tau-protein kinase activity; protein binding; nucleotide binding; p53 binding; ubiquitin protein ligase binding; protease binding; beta-catenin binding; protein kinase binding; dynactin binding; tau protein binding
Cellular component	cytoplasm; membrane; mitochondrion; nucleus; centrosome; plasma membrane; cytosol; beta-catenin destruction complex; postsynapse; Wnt signalosome; nucleoplasm; axon; dendrite; glutamatergic synapse
Biological process	rhythmic process; negative regulation of type B pancreatic cell development; negative regulation of protein binding; negative regulation of glycogen (starch) synthase activity; glycogen metabolic process; superior temporal gyrus development; negative regulation of canonical Wnt signaling pathway; chemical synaptic transmission, postsynaptic; negative regulation of protein-containing complex assembly; positive regulation of protein export from nucleus; positive regulation of GTPase activity; protein autophosphorylation; cell differentiation; negative regulation of protein localization to nucleus; phosphorylation; positive regulation of cell-matrix adhesion; nervous system development; dopamine receptor signaling pathway; epithelial to mesenchymal transition; peptidyl-threonine phosphorylation; positive regulation of protein-containing complex assembly; positive regulation of neuron death; negative regulation of glycogen biosynthetic process; multicellular organism development; regulation of cellular response to heat; negative regulation of signal transduction; hippocampus development; beta-catenin destruction complex disassembly; proteasome-mediated ubiquitin-dependent protein catabolic process; Wnt signaling pathway; beta-catenin destruction complex assembly; protein phosphorylation; positive regulation of mitochondrion organization; intracellular signal transduction; positive regulation of protein catabolic process; negative regulation of dopaminergic neuron differentiation; ER overload response; circadian rhythm; peptidyl-serine phosphorylation; positive regulation of protein binding; positive regulation of proteasomal ubiquitin-dependent protein catabolic process; regulation of microtubule-based process; cellular response to interleukin-3; negative regulation of apoptotic process; canonical Wnt signaling pathway; extrinsic apoptotic signaling pathway in absence of ligand; positive regulation of mitochondrial outer membrane permeabilization involved in apoptotic signaling pathway; carbohydrate metabolic process; neuron projection development; negative regulation of neuron death; positive regulation of gene expression; establishment of cell polarity; maintenance of cell polarity; regulation of axon extension; negative regulation of phosphoprotein phosphatase activity; regulation of dendrite morphogenesis; regulation of axonogenesis; excitatory postsynaptic potential; regulation of microtubule cytoskeleton organization; negative regulation of calcineurin-NFAT signaling cascade; extrinsic apoptotic signaling pathway; neuron projection retraction; negative regulation of protein acetylation; cellular response to amyloid-beta; positive regulation of protein localization to centrosome; regulation of synaptic vesicle exocytosis; neuron projection organization; positive regulation of autophagy; regulation of circadian rhythm; regulation of long-term synaptic potentiation; regulation of microtubule anchoring at centrosome
Sources:Amigo / QuickGO
Orthologs
Databases	NCBI: entry; OMA: entry
Species	Human	Mouse
Entrez	2932	56637
Ensembl	ENSG00000082701	ENSMUSG00000022812
UniProt	P49841	Q9WV60
RefSeq (mRNA)	NM_001146156; NM_002093; NM_001354596	NM_019827; NM_001347232
RefSeq (protein)	NP_001139628; NP_002084; NP_001341525	NP_001334161; NP_062801
Location (UCSC)	Chr 3: 119.82 – 120.09 Mb	Chr 16: 37.91 – 38.07 Mb
PubMed search
- Wikidata
View/Edit Human	View/Edit Mouse

Glycogen synthase kinase-3 beta, (GSK-3 beta), is an enzyme that in humans is encoded by the GSK3B gene. In mice, the enzyme is encoded by the Gsk3b gene. Abnormal regulation and expression of GSK-3 beta is associated with an increased susceptibility towards bipolar disorder.

== Function ==
Glycogen synthase kinase-3 (GSK-3) is a proline-directed serine-threonine kinase that was initially identified as a phosphorylating and an inactivating agent of glycogen synthase. Two isoforms, alpha (GSK3A) and beta, show a high degree of amino acid homology.

GSK3B is involved in energy metabolism, neuronal cell development, and body pattern formation.

== Disease relevance ==
Homozygous disruption of the Gsk3b locus in mice results in embryonic lethality during mid-gestation. This lethality phenotype could be rescued by inhibition of tumor necrosis factor.

Two SNPs at this gene, rs334558 (-50T/C) and rs3755557 (-1727A/T), are associated with efficacy of lithium treatment in bipolar disorder.

== Signaling pathways ==
Pharmacological inhibition of ERK1/2 restores GSK-3 beta activity and protein synthesis levels in a model of tuberous sclerosis.

== Interactions ==
GSK3B has been shown to interact with:

- KIAA1211L
- ATP2A2
- AKAP11,
- AXIN1,
- AXIN2,
- AR,
- CTNNB1,
- DNM1L,
- MACF1
- MUC1,
- SMAD3
- NOTCH1,
- NOTCH2,
- P53,
- PRKAR2A,
- SGK3, and
- TSC2.

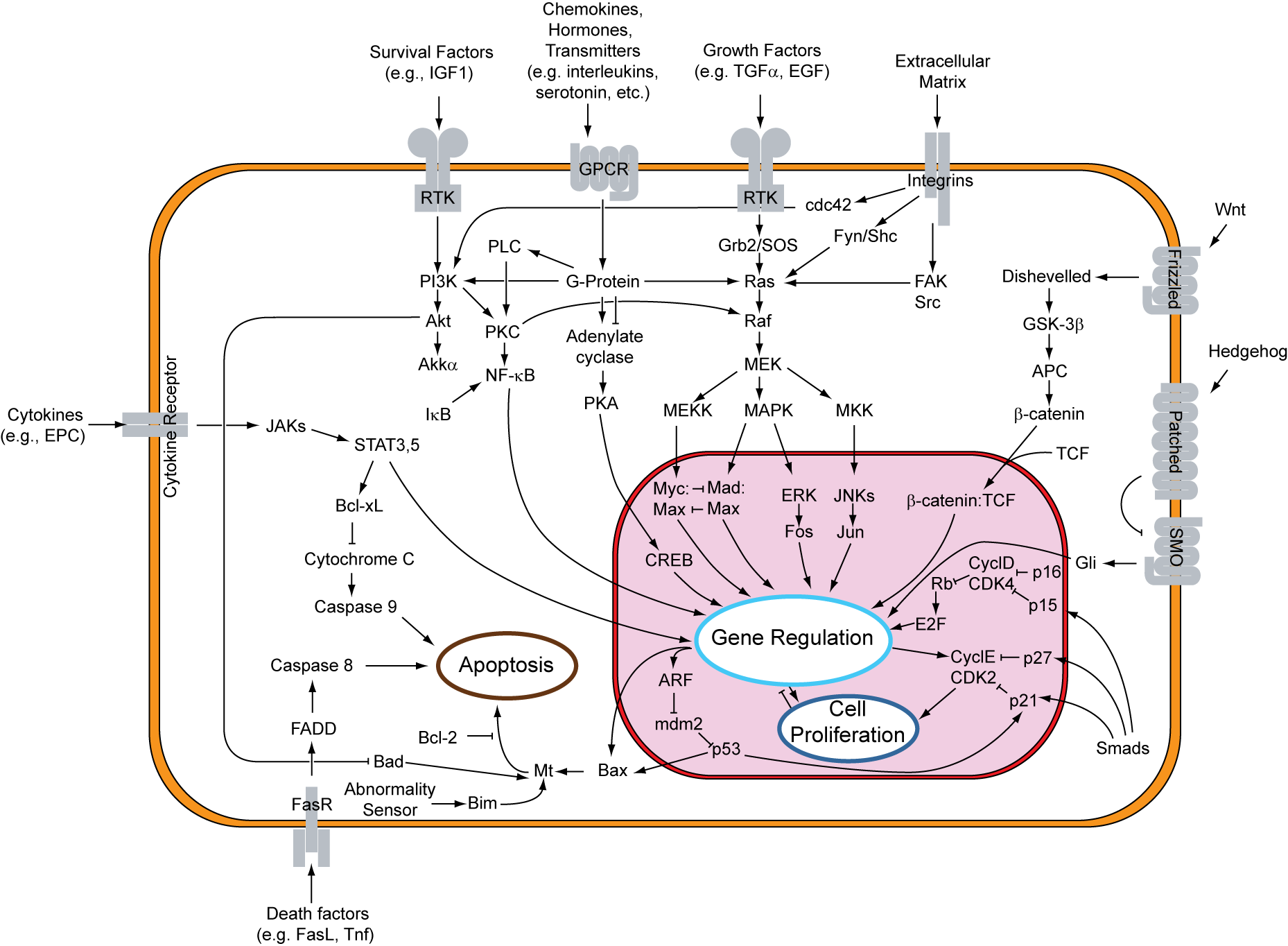
Overview of signal transduction pathways involved in apoptosis.

== See also ==
- GSK-3 – Class of enzymes
