= Tideglusib =

Chemical compound

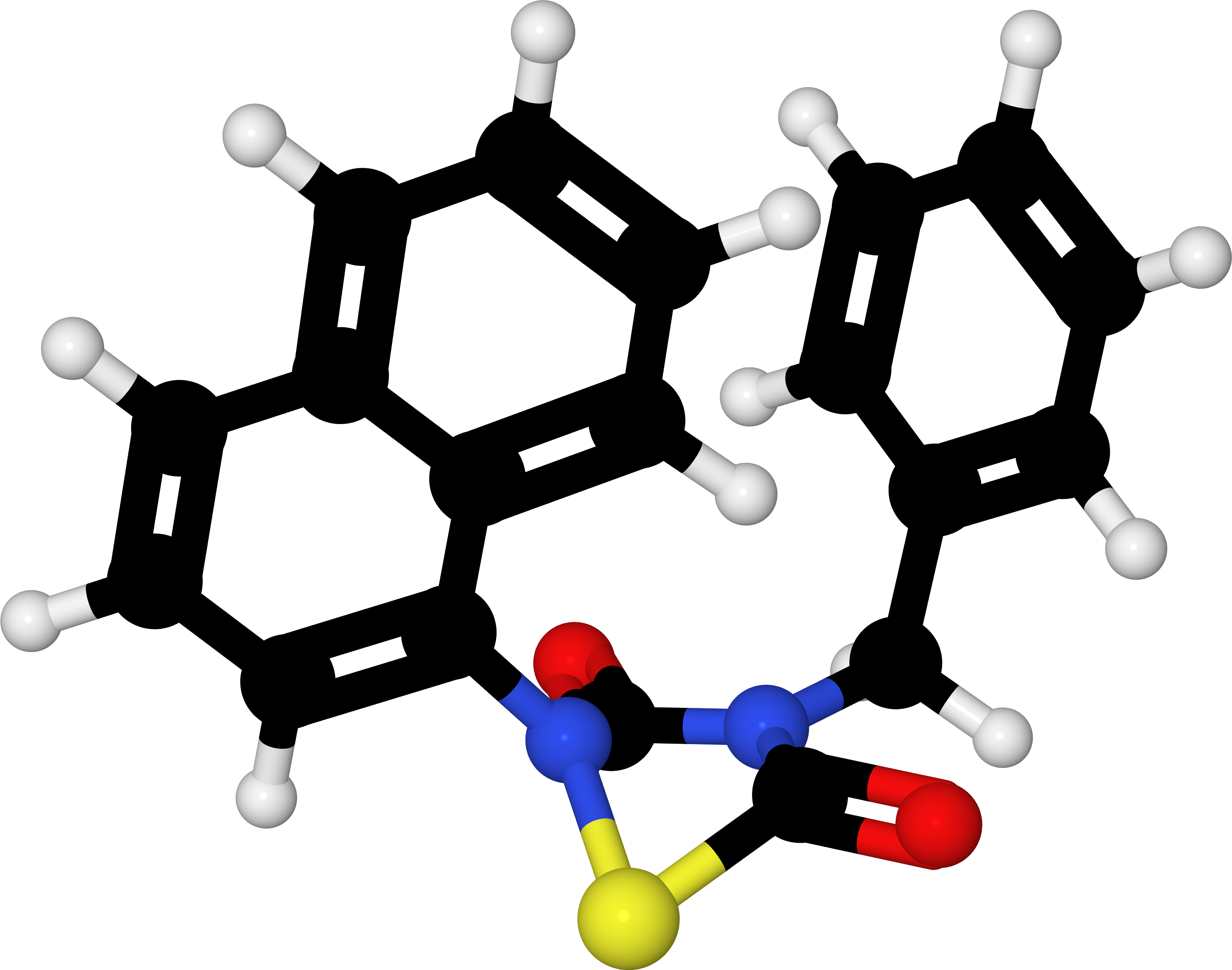

Identifiers
- IUPAC name: 4-Benzyl-2-(naphthalen-1-yl)-1,2,4-thiadiazolidine-3,5-dione
- CAS Number: 865854-05-3
- PubChem CID: 11313622
- ChemSpider: 9488589
- UNII: Q747Y6TT42
- ChEBI: CHEBI:147398
- CompTox Dashboard (EPA): DTXSID90235682

Chemical and physical data
- Formula: C_{19}H_{14}N_{2}O_{2}S
- Molar mass: 334.39 g·mol^{−1}
- 3D model (JSmol): Interactive image
- SMILES: O=C3SN(c1cccc2c1cccc2)C(=O)N3Cc4ccccc4
- InChI: InChI=1S/C19H14N2O2S/c22-18-20(13-14-7-2-1-3-8-14)19(23)24-21(18)17-12-6-10-15-9-4-5-11-16(15)17/h1-12H,13H2

Tideglusib (NP-12, NP031112) is a potent and irreversible small molecule glycogen synthase kinase 3 (GSK-3) inhibitor.

== Clinical trials ==
Tideglusib has been evaluated in clinical trials for:

- Alzheimer's disease and progressive supranuclear palsy. Both clinical trials were discontinued in 2011 (PSP) and 2012 (Alzheimer's disease) due to lack of efficacy
- Congenital/juvenile-onset myotonic muscular dystrophy type I.

== Research ==
Tideglusib is or has been under investigation for multiple applications:

- Tooth repair mechanisms that promotes dentine reinforcement of a sponge structure until the sponge biodegrades, leaving a solid dentine structure. In 2016, the results of animal studies were reported in which 0.14 mm holes in mouse teeth were permanently filled.
- Preclinical in vitro studies were carried out for neuroblastoma and ovarian cancer with significant ROS-induced apoptosis.
- Arrhythmogenic right ventricular cardiomyopathy as of 2025.
