= Ontunisertib =

Investigational drug

Clinical data
- Other names: AGMB-129

Identifiers
- IUPAC name: N-[(2,6-difluorophenyl)methyl]-2-[3-(6-methyl-2-pyridinyl)-4-quinolin-4-ylpyrazol-1-yl]acetamide
- CAS Number: 2647949-48-0
- PubChem CID: 156744887
- IUPHAR/BPS: 13846
- ChemSpider: 133323111
- UNII: SF6HGC94LK
- KEGG: D13315

Chemical and physical data
- Formula: C_{27}H_{21}F_{2}N_{5}O
- Molar mass: 469.496 g·mol^{−1}
- 3D model (JSmol): Interactive image
- SMILES: CC1=NC(=CC=C1)C2=NN(C=C2C3=CC=NC4=CC=CC=C34)CC(=O)NCC5=C(C=CC=C5F)F
- InChI: InChI=InChI=1S/C27H21F2N5O/c1-17-6-4-11-25(32-17)27-21(18-12-13-30-24-10-3-2-7-19(18)24)15-34(33-27)16-26(35)31-14-20-22(28)8-5-9-23(20)29/h2-13,15H,14,16H2,1H3,(H,31,35); Key:QGXRIRYULXOGDQ-UHFFFAOYSA-N

Ontunisertib is an investigational new drug that is being evaluated by Agomab Spain S.L.U. for the treatment of fibrostenotic Crohn's Disease. It is a TGF beta receptor 1 (ALK5) antagonist.
