= CLASP2 =

Protein found in humans

Identifiers
- Aliases: CLASP2, cytoplasmic linker associated protein 2
- External IDs: OMIM: 605853; MGI: 1923749; GeneCards: CLASP2
Available structures
PDB	Ortholog search: PDBe RCSB
PDB	List of PDB id codes 3WOY

Gene location (Human)
Chr.	Chromosome 3 (human)
Band	3p22.3	Start	33,496,245 bp
Band	3p22.3	End	33,718,356 bp

Gene location (Mouse)
Chr.	Chromosome 9 (mouse)
Band	9|9 F3	Start	113,741,473 bp
Band	9|9 F3	End	113,919,682 bp
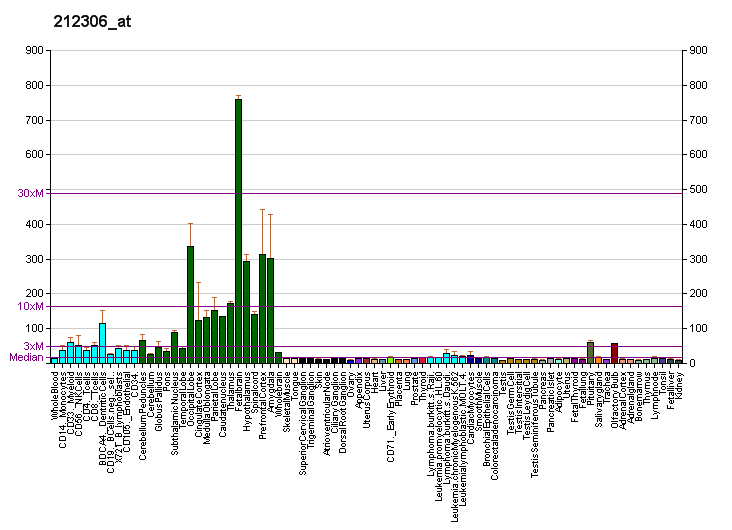

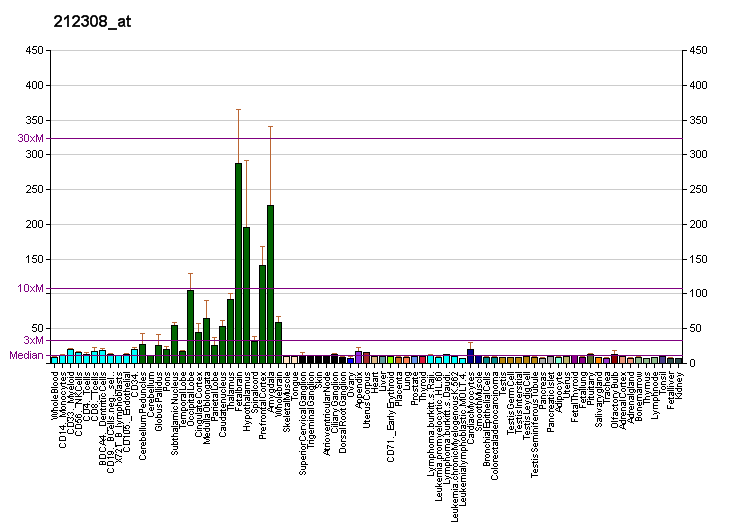

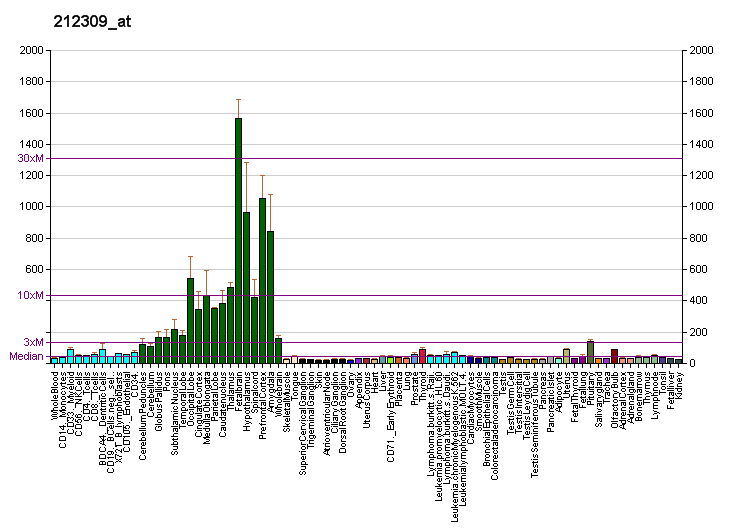
RNA expression pattern
Bgee	Human / Mouse (ortholog); Top expressed in: corpus callosum; paraflocculus of cerebellum; middle frontal gyrus; Brodmann area 10; frontal pole; endothelial cell; lateral nuclear group of thalamus; ganglionic eminence; subthalamic nucleus; inferior ganglion of vagus nerve / Top expressed in: lateral geniculate nucleus; inferior colliculi; medial geniculate nucleus; pineal gland; mammillary body; superior colliculus; medial dorsal nucleus; cerebellar vermis; lobe of cerebellum; globus pallidus; More reference expression data
BioGPS	More reference expression data
Gene ontology
Molecular function	protein tyrosine kinase binding; dystroglycan binding; microtubule binding; microtubule plus-end binding; actin filament binding; protein binding; kinetochore binding
Cellular component	cytoplasm; Golgi apparatus; cell projection; kinetochore microtubule; membrane; focal adhesion; plasma membrane; axonal growth cone; spindle; microtubule organizing center; chromosome; ruffle membrane; trans-Golgi network; cell cortex; cell leading edge; cortical microtubule plus-end; cytoplasmic microtubule; mitotic spindle; basal cortex; microtubule; chromosome, centromeric region; cytoskeleton; kinetochore; cytosol
Biological process	vesicle targeting; regulation of actin cytoskeleton organization; regulation of axon extension; Golgi organization; mitotic spindle organization; regulation of epithelial to mesenchymal transition; positive regulation of epithelial cell migration; exit from mitosis; cell division; establishment or maintenance of cell polarity; positive regulation of extracellular matrix disassembly; positive regulation of basement membrane assembly involved in embryonic body morphogenesis; negative regulation of microtubule depolymerization; microtubule anchoring; regulation of microtubule-based process; regulation of microtubule polymerization; regulation of microtubule polymerization or depolymerization; negative regulation of wound healing, spreading of epidermal cells; cell cycle; positive regulation of exocytosis; negative regulation of stress fiber assembly; microtubule organizing center organization; negative regulation of focal adhesion assembly; regulation of gastrulation; microtubule cytoskeleton organization; microtubule nucleation; platelet-derived growth factor receptor-beta signaling pathway; sister chromatid cohesion; protein localization to plasma membrane
Sources:Amigo / QuickGO
Orthologs
Databases	NCBI: entry; OMA: entry
Species	Human	Mouse
Entrez	23122	76499
Ensembl	ENSG00000163539	ENSMUSG00000033392
UniProt	O75122	Q8BRT1
RefSeq (mRNA)	NM_001207044; NM_015097; NM_001365627; NM_001365628; NM_001365629 NM_001365630; NM_001365631; NM_001365632; NM_001365633; NM_001365634; NM_001375694; NM_001375697; NM_001375700; NM_001375701; NM_001375703; NM_001375705; NM_001375713; NM_001375715; NM_001375716; NM_001375718; NM_001375720	NM_001081960; NM_001114347; NM_001286599; NM_001286600; NM_001286601 NM_001286602; NM_001286603; NM_029633
RefSeq (protein)	NP_001193973; NP_055912; NP_001352556; NP_001352557; NP_001352558 NP_001352559; NP_001352560; NP_001352561; NP_001352562; NP_001352563; NP_001362623; NP_001362626; NP_001362629; NP_001362630; NP_001362632; NP_001362634; NP_001362642; NP_001362644; NP_001362645; NP_001362647; NP_001362649	NP_001075429; NP_001107819; NP_001273528; NP_001273529; NP_001273530 NP_001273531; NP_001273532; NP_083909
Location (UCSC)	Chr 3: 33.5 – 33.72 Mb	Chr 9: 113.74 – 113.92 Mb
PubMed search
- Wikidata
View/Edit Human	View/Edit Mouse

Cytoplasmic linker associated protein 2, also known as CLASP2, is a protein which in humans is encoded by the CLASP2 gene.
