= GSK3A =

Protein-coding gene in the species Homo sapiens

Available structures
PDB	Ortholog search: PDBe RCSB
PDB	List of PDB id codes 2DFM

Identifiers
- Aliases: GSK3A, Gsk3a, 2700086H06Rik, glycogen synthase kinase 3 alpha
- External IDs: OMIM: 606784; MGI: 2152453; HomoloGene: 88581; GeneCards: GSK3A; OMA:GSK3A - orthologs
- EC number: 2.7.11.1

Gene location (Human)
Chr.	Chromosome 19 (human)
Band	19q13.2	Start	42,226,225 bp
Band	19q13.2	End	42,242,625 bp

Gene location (Mouse)
Chr.	Chromosome 7 (mouse)
Band	7|7 A3	Start	24,927,683 bp
Band	7|7 A3	End	24,937,276 bp
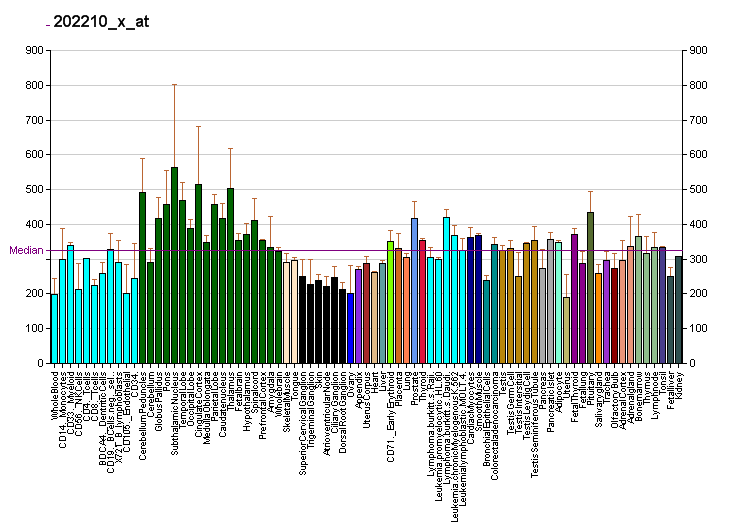

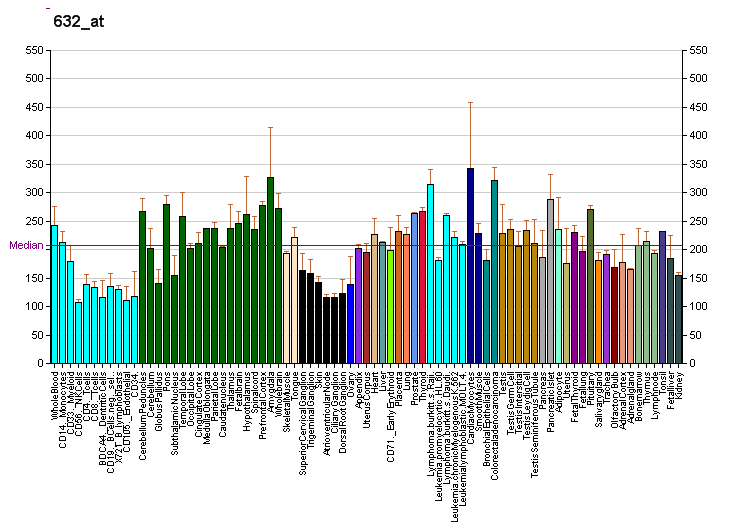
RNA expression pattern
Bgee	Human / Mouse (ortholog); Top expressed in: ganglionic eminence; ventricular zone; right frontal lobe; right hemisphere of cerebellum; prefrontal cortex; cingulate gyrus; anterior cingulate cortex; granulocyte; epithelium of colon; beta cell / Top expressed in: motor neuron; primary motor cortex; superior colliculus; subiculum; piriform cortex; cingulate gyrus; pontine nuclei; anterior amygdaloid area; dorsal tegmental nucleus; globus pallidus; More reference expression data
BioGPS	More reference expression data
Gene ontology
Molecular function	transferase activity; nucleotide binding; protein kinase activity; kinase activity; protein serine/threonine kinase activity; tau-protein kinase activity; protein binding; ATP binding; protein kinase binding; protein kinase A catalytic subunit binding; signaling receptor binding; tau protein binding
Cellular component	cytosol; beta-catenin destruction complex; postsynapse; mitochondrion; cytoplasm; microtubule; soma; apical dendrite; proximal dendrite
Biological process	positive regulation of protein catabolic process; phosphorylation; positive regulation of protein targeting to mitochondrion; chemical synaptic transmission, postsynaptic; negative regulation of UDP-glucose catabolic process; negative regulation of type B pancreatic cell development; Wnt signaling pathway; negative regulation of glycogen biosynthetic process; nervous system development; negative regulation of glycogen synthase activity, transferring glucose-1-phosphate; dopamine receptor signaling pathway; protein phosphorylation; IRE1-mediated unfolded protein response; negative regulation of glucose import; negative regulation of insulin receptor signaling pathway; regulation of autophagy of mitochondrion; negative regulation of glycogen (starch) synthase activity; cellular response to insulin stimulus; glycogen metabolic process; negative regulation of signal transduction; negative regulation of canonical Wnt signaling pathway; regulation of systemic arterial blood pressure; cardiac left ventricle morphogenesis; regulation of gene expression by genetic imprinting; ageing; insulin receptor signaling pathway; positive regulation of peptidyl-threonine phosphorylation; cell migration; negative regulation of TOR signaling; positive regulation of peptidyl-serine phosphorylation; cellular response to interleukin-3; proteasome-mediated ubiquitin-dependent protein catabolic process; positive regulation of neuron apoptotic process; hypermethylation of CpG island; positive regulation of heart contraction; positive regulation of transcription by RNA polymerase II; negative regulation of cell growth involved in cardiac muscle cell development; cellular response to lithium ion; cellular response to organic cyclic compound; positive regulation of adenylate cyclase-activating adrenergic receptor signaling pathway; extrinsic apoptotic signaling pathway in absence of ligand; positive regulation of mitochondrial outer membrane permeabilization involved in apoptotic signaling pathway; negative regulation of dendrite development; positive regulation of glycogen (starch) synthase activity; carbohydrate metabolic process; positive regulation of gene expression; peptidyl-threonine phosphorylation; positive regulation of protein ubiquitination; positive regulation of proteasomal ubiquitin-dependent protein catabolic process; excitatory postsynaptic potential; extrinsic apoptotic signaling pathway; positive regulation of adenylate cyclase-activating G protein-coupled receptor signaling pathway; positive regulation of amyloid-beta formation; positive regulation of autophagy
Sources:Amigo / QuickGO
Orthologs
Species	Human	Mouse
Entrez	2931	606496
Ensembl	ENSG00000105723	ENSMUSG00000057177
UniProt	P49840	Q2NL51
RefSeq (mRNA)	NM_019884	NM_001031667
RefSeq (protein)	NP_063937	NP_001026837
Location (UCSC)	Chr 19: 42.23 – 42.24 Mb	Chr 7: 24.93 – 24.94 Mb
PubMed search
- Wikidata
View/Edit Human	View/Edit Mouse

Glycogen synthase kinase-3 alpha is an enzyme that in humans is encoded by the GSK3A gene.

Glycogen synthase kinase 3-alpha EC 2.7.1.37 is a multifunctional protein serine kinase, homologous to Drosophila 'shaggy' (zeste-white3) and implicated in the control of several regulatory proteins including glycogen synthase and various transcription factors (e.g., JUN). It also plays a role in the WNT and phosphoinositide 3-kinase (especially PIK3CG) signaling pathways.

== See also ==
- Glycogen synthase kinase 3
