= Galunisertib =

Chemical compound

Clinical data
- Routes of administration: PO

Identifiers
- IUPAC name: 4-(5,6-Dihydro-2-(6-methyl-2-pyridinyl)-4H-pyrrolo(1,2-b)pyrazol-3-yl)-6-quinolinecarboxamide
- CAS Number: 700874-72-2
- PubChem CID: 10090485
- ChemSpider: 8266022
- UNII: 3OKH1W5LZE
- KEGG: D10437
- ChEBI: CHEBI:137064
- CompTox Dashboard (EPA): DTXSID00220362

Chemical and physical data
- Formula: C_{22}H_{19}N_{5}O
- Molar mass: 369.428 g·mol^{−1}
- 3D model (JSmol): Interactive image
- SMILES: N1=CC=C(C2=CC(=CC=C12)C(=O)N)C1=C2N(N=C1C1C=CC=C(N=1)C)CCC2
- InChI: InChI=1S/C22H19N5O/c1-13-4-2-5-18(25-13)21-20(19-6-3-11-27(19)26-21)15-9-10-24-17-8-7-14(22(23)28)12-16(15)17/h2,4-5,7-10,12H,3,6,11H2,1H3,(H2,23,28); Key:IVRXNBXKWIJUQB-UHFFFAOYSA-N

Galunisertib (LY2157299) is a small molecular experimental cancer drug previously in development by Eli Lilly. It is a TGF-b inhibitor. Development of galunisertib by Eli Lilly was discontinued in January 2020.

Galunisertib was investigated in a phase II trial for treatment of hepatocellular carcinoma. Pre-clinically, combination of galunisertib with PD-L1 blockade resulted in improved tumor growth inhibition.
