= Transforming growth factor beta =

Cytokine

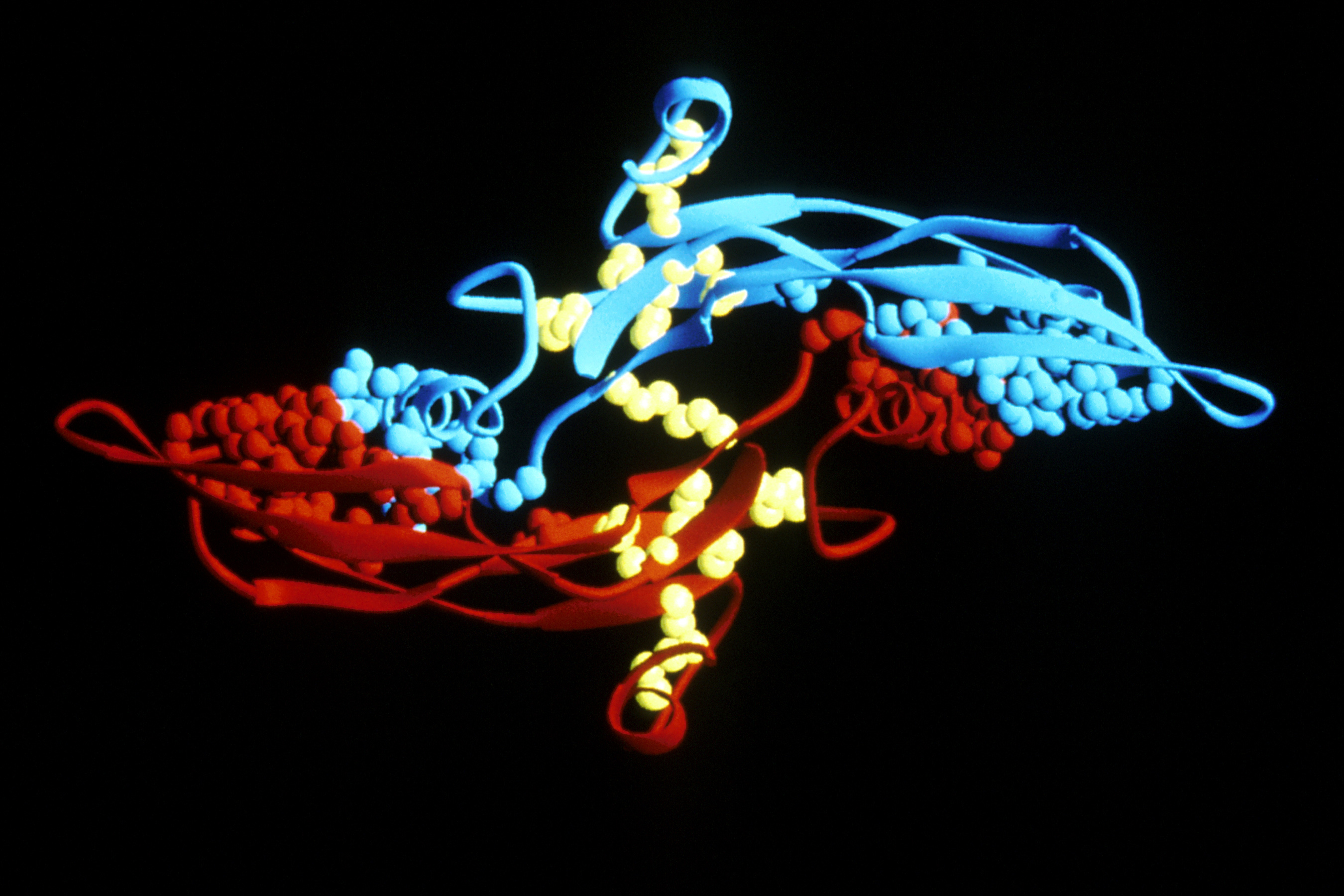
Computer graphic of TGF-beta. TGF-beta is a cytokine with three different isoforms, which regulates many cellular functions including cell proliferation, differentiation, adhesion and migration

Transforming growth factor beta (TGF-β) is a multifunctional cytokine belonging to the transforming growth factor superfamily that includes three different mammalian isoforms (TGF-β 1 to 3, HGNC symbols TGFB1, TGFB2, TGFB3) and many other signaling proteins. TGFB proteins are produced by all white blood cell lineages.

Activated TGF-β complexes with cell surface TGF-β receptors to form an active serine/threonine kinase complex. After binding their TGF-β protein ligand, TGF-β receptors assemble into heterotetramers composed of two each of the type 1 and type 2 receptor subunits, both of which are serine/threonine kinases. Upon assembly, the type 2 receptor kinase phosphorylates and activates the type 1 receptor kinase to initiate a signaling cascade. This leads to the activation of different downstream substrates and regulatory proteins, inducing transcription of different target genes that function in differentiation, chemotaxis, proliferation, and activation of many immune cells.

TGF-β is secreted by many cell types, including macrophages, in a latent form in which it is complexed with two other polypeptides, latent TGF-beta binding protein (LTBP) and latency-associated peptide (LAP). Serum proteinases such as plasmin catalyze the release of active TGF-β from the complex. This often occurs on the surface of macrophages where the latent TGF-β complex is bound to CD36 via its ligand, thrombospondin-1 (TSP-1). Inflammatory stimuli that activate macrophages enhance the release of active TGF-β by promoting the activation of plasmin. Macrophages can also endocytose IgG-bound latent TGF-β complexes that are secreted by plasma cells and then release active TGF-β into the extracellular fluid. Among its key functions is regulation of inflammatory processes, particularly in the gut. TGF-β also plays a crucial role in stem cell differentiation as well as T-cell regulation and differentiation.

Because of its role in immune and stem cell regulation and differentiation, it is a highly researched cytokine in the fields of cancer, autoimmune diseases, and infectious disease.

The TGF-β superfamily includes endogenous growth inhibiting proteins; an increase in expression of TGF-β often correlates with the malignancy of many cancers and a defect in the cellular growth inhibition response to TGF-β. Its immunosuppressive functions then come to dominate, contributing to oncogenesis. The dysregulation of its immunosuppressive functions is also implicated in the pathogenesis of autoimmune diseases, although their effect is mediated by the environment of other cytokines present.

== Structure ==
The primary three mammalian types are:

- TGF beta 1 – TGFB1
- TGF beta 2 – TGFB2
- TGF beta 3 – TGFB3

A fourth member of the subfamily, TGFB4, has been identified in birds and a fifth, TGFB5, only in frogs.

The peptide structures of the TGF-β isoforms are highly similar (homologies on the order of 70–80%). They are all encoded as large protein precursors; TGF-β1 contains 390 amino acids and TGF-β2 and TGF-β3 each contain 412 amino acids. They each have an N-terminal signal peptide of 20–30 amino acids that they require for secretion from a cell, a pro-region called latency-associated peptide (LAP - Alias: Pro-TGF beta 1, LAP/TGF beta 1), and a 112-114 amino acid C-terminal region that becomes the mature TGF-β molecule following its release from the pro-region by proteolytic cleavage. The mature TGF-β protein dimerizes to produce a 25 KDa active protein with many conserved structural motifs. TGF-β has nine cysteine residues that are conserved among its family. Eight form disulfide bonds within the protein to create a cysteine knot structure characteristic of the TGF-β superfamily. The ninth cysteine forms a disulfide bond with the ninth cysteine of another TGF-β protein to produce a dimer. Many other conserved residues in TGF-β are thought to form secondary structure through hydrophobic interactions. The region between the fifth and sixth conserved cysteines houses the most divergent area of TGF-β proteins that is exposed at the surface of the protein and is implicated in receptor binding and specificity of TGF-β.

== Latent TGF-β complex ==
All three TGF-βs are synthesized as precursor molecules containing a propeptide region in addition to the TGF-β homodimer. After it is synthesized, the TGF-β homodimer interacts with a latency-associated peptide (LAP), a protein derived from the N-terminal region of the TGF-β gene product, forming a complex called small latent complex (SLC). This complex remains in the cell until it is bound by another protein called Latent TGF-β-Binding Protein (LTBP), forming a larger complex called large latent complex (LLC). It is this LLC that gets secreted to the extracellular matrix (ECM).

In most cases, before the LLC is secreted, the TGF-β precursor is cleaved from the propeptide but remains attached to it by noncovalent bonds. After its secretion, it remains in the extracellular matrix as an in activated complex containing both the LTBP and the LAP which need to be further processed in order to release active TGF-β. The attachment of TGF-β to the LTBP is by disulfide bond which allows it to remain inactive by preventing it from binding to its receptors. Because different cellular mechanisms require distinct levels of TGF-β signaling, the inactive complex of this cytokine gives opportunity for a proper mediation of TGF-β signaling.

There are four different LTBP isoforms known, LTBP-1, LTBP-2, LTBP-3 and LTBP-4. Mutation or alteration of LAP or LTBP can result in improper TGF-β signaling. Mice lacking LTBP-3 or LTBP-4 demonstrate phenotypes consistent to phenotypes seen in mice with altered TGF-β signaling. Furthermore, specific LTBP isoforms have a propensity to associate with specific LAP•TGF-β isoforms. For example, LTBP-4 is reported to bind only to TGF-β1, thus, mutation in LTBP-4 can lead to TGF-β associated complications which are specific to tissues that predominantly involves TGF-β1. Moreover, the structural differences within the LAP's provide different latent TGF-β complexes which are selective but to specific stimuli generated by specific activators.

== Activation ==
Although TGF-β is important in regulating crucial cellular activities, only a few TGF-β activating pathways are currently known, and the full mechanism behind the suggested activation pathways is not yet well understood. Some of the known activating pathways are cell or tissue specific, while some are seen in multiple cell types and tissues. Proteases, integrins, pH, and reactive oxygen species are just few of the currently known factors that can activate TGF-β, as discussed below. It is well known that perturbations of these activating factors can lead to unregulated TGF-β signaling levels that may cause several complications including inflammation, autoimmune disorders, fibrosis, cancer and cataracts. In most cases, an activated TGF-β ligand will initiate the TGF-β signaling cascade as long as TGF-β receptors I and II are available for binding. This is due to a high affinity between TGF-β and its receptors, suggesting why the TGF-β signaling recruits a latency system to mediate its signaling.

== Integrin-independent activation ==
=== Activation by protease and metalloprotease ===
Plasmin and a member of matrix metalloproteinases (MMP) play a key role in promoting tumor invasion and tissue remodeling by inducing proteolysis of several ECM components. The TGF-β activation process involves the release of the LLC from the matrix, followed by further proteolysis of the LAP to release TGF-β to its receptors. MMP-9 and MMP-2 are known to cleave latent TGF-β. The LAP complex contains a protease-sensitive hinge region which can be the potential target for this liberation of TGF-β. Despite the fact that MMPs have been proven to play a key role in activating TGF-β, mice with mutations in MMP-9 and MMP-2 genes can still activate TGF-β and do not show any TGF-β deficiency phenotypes, this may reflect redundancy among the activating enzymes suggesting that other unknown proteases might be involved.

=== Activation by pH ===
Acidic conditions can denature the LAP. Treatment of the medium with extremes of pH (1.5 or 12) resulted in significant activation of TGF-β as shown by radio-receptor assays, while mild acid treatment (pH 4.5) yielded only 20-30% of the activation achieved by pH 1.5.

=== Activation by reactive oxygen species (ROS) ===
The structure of LAP is important in maintaining its function. Structure modification of LAP can lead to disturb the interaction between LAP and TGF-β and thus activating it. Factors that may cause such modification may include hydroxyl radicals from reactive oxygen species (ROS). TGF-β was rapidly activated after in vivo radiation exposure ROS.

=== Activation by thrombospondin-1 ===
Thrombospondin-1 (TSP-1) is a matricellular glycoprotein found in plasma of healthy patients with levels in the range of 50–250 ng/ml. TSP-1 levels are known to increase in response to injury and during development. TSP-1 activates latent TGF-beta by forming direct interactions with the latent TGF-β complex and induces a conformational rearrangement preventing it from binding to the matured TGF-β.

== Activation by Alpha(V) containing integrins ==
The general theme of integrins participating in latent TGF-β1 activation arose from studies that examined mutations/knockouts of β6 integrin, αV integrin, β8 integrin and in LAP. These mutations produced phenotypes that were similar to phenotypes seen in TGF-β1 knockout mice. Currently there are two proposed models of how αV containing integrins can activate latent TGF-β1; the first proposed model is by inducing conformational change to the latent TGF-β1 complex and hence releasing the active TGF-β1 and the second model is by a protease-dependent mechanism.

=== Conformation change mechanism pathway (without proteolysis) ===
αVβ6 integrin was the first integrin to be identified as TGF-β1 activator. LAPs contain an RGD motif which is recognized by vast majority of αV containing integrins, and αVβ6 integrin can activate TGF-β1 by binding to the RGD motif present in LAP-β1 and LAP-β3. Upon binding, it induces adhesion-mediated cell forces that are translated into biochemical signals which can lead to liberation/activation of TGFb from its latent complex. This pathway has been demonstrated for activation of TGF-β in epithelial cells and does not associate MMPs.

=== Integrin protease-dependent activation mechanism ===
Because MMP-2 and MMP-9 can activate TGF-β through proteolytic degradation of the latent TGF beta complex, αV containing integrins activate TGF-β1 by creating a close connection between the latent TGF-β complex and MMPs. Integrins αVβ6 and αVβ3 are suggested to simultaneously bind the latent TGF-β1 complex and proteinases, simultaneous inducing conformational changes of the LAP and sequestering proteases to close proximity. Regardless of involving MMPs, this mechanism still necessitates the association of integrins and that makes it a non proteolytic pathway.

== Signaling pathways ==
The SMAD Pathway

The DAXX Pathway

=== Canonical signaling: The SMAD pathway ===
Smads are a class of intracellular signalling proteins and transcription factors for the TGF-β family of signalling molecules. This pathway conceptually resembles the Jak-STAT signal transduction pathway characterized in the activation of cytokine receptors implicated, for example, in the B cell isotype switching pathway. As previously stated, the binding of the TGF-β ligand to the TGF-β receptor, the type 2 receptor kinase phosphorylates and activates the type 1 receptor kinase that activates a signaling cascade. In the case of Smad, receptor-activated Smads are phosphorylated by the type 1 TGF-β receptor kinase, and these go on to complex with other Smads, which is able to translocate into the cell nucleus to induce transcription of different effectors.

More specifically, activated TGF-β complexes bind to the type 2 domain of the TGF-β receptor which then recruits and phosphorylates a type 1 receptor. The type 1 receptor then recruits and phosphorylates a receptor regulated SMAD (R-SMAD). The R-SMAD then binds to the common SMAD (coSMAD) SMAD4 and forms a heterodimeric complex. This complex then enters the cell nucleus where it acts as a transcription factor for various genes, including those to activate the mitogen-activated protein kinase 8 pathway, which triggers apoptosis. The SMAD pathway is regulated by feedback inhibition. SMAD6 and SMAD7 may block type I receptors. There is also substantial evidence that TGF-β-dependent signaling via the SMAD-3 pathway is responsible for many of the inhibitory functions of TGF-β discussed in later sections and thus it is implicated in oncogenesis.

The Smads are not the only TGF-β-regulated signaling pathways. Non-Smad signaling proteins can initiate parallel signaling that eventually cooperate with the Smads or crosstalk with other major signaling pathways. Among them, the mitogen-activated protein kinase (MAPK) family that include the extracellular-regulated kinases (ERK1 and 2), Jun N-terminal kinases (JNKs) and p38 MAPK play an important role in the TGF-β signaling. ERK 1 and 2 are activated via the Raf-Ras-MEK1/2 pathway induced by mitogenic stimuli such as epidermal growth factor, whereas the JNK and p38 MAPK are activated by the MAPK kinase, activated themselves by the TGF-β-activated kinase-1 (TAK1) upon stress stimuli.

=== Apoptosis via the DAXX pathway ===
TGF-β induces apoptosis, a form of programmed cell death, in human lymphocytes and hepatocytes. The importance of this function is clear in TGF-β deficient mice which experience hyperproliferation and unregulated autoimmunity. In a separate apoptotic pathway from the association of death-associated protein 6 (DAXX) with the death receptor Fas, there is evidence of association and binding between DAXX and type 2 TGF-β receptor kinase, wherein DAXX binds to the C-terminal region of the type 2 TGF-β receptor. The exact molecular mechanism is unknown, but as a general overview, DAXX is then phosphorylated by homeodomain-interacting protein kinase 2 (HIPK2), which then activates apoptosis signal-inducing kinase 1 (ASK1), which goes on to activate the Jun amino-terminal kinase (JNK) pathway and thus apoptosis as seen in the left panel of the adjacent image.

== TGFβ receptor inhibitors ==
Galunisertib is the selective and potent TGFβRI kinase inhibitor.

== TGF-β mimic ==
The parasitic roundworm Heligmosomoides polygyrus secretes a molecule that mimics the ability of mammalian TGF-β to bind to the TGFβR complex and trigger downstream signalling pathways. This molecule, termed Hp-TGM, shares no sequence homology to TGF-β and is secreted by H. polygyrus in a biologically active form. Hp-TGM consists of 5 domains, with the first three shown to crucial for interaction with the TGFβR complex, with functions for domains 4 and 5 not yet known. Importantly, Hp-TGM shows promise as a novel therapeutic as it induces less fibrosis than TGF-β in vivo in mice and can be used to induce populations of human FOXP3^{+} regulatory T cells that had much greater stability than those induced by TGF-β.

== Effects on immune cells ==
=== T lymphocytes ===
TGF-β1 plays a role in the induction from CD4^{+} T cells of both induced T_{reg} cells (iT_{reg} cells), which have a regulatory function, and T_{h}17 cells, which secrete pro-inflammatory cytokines.

TGF-β1 alone precipitates the expression of FOXP3 and T_{reg} differentiation from activated T helper cells, and the mechanism for this differentiation is unknown for both induced T regulatory cells as well as natural T regulatory cells. In mouse models, the effect of TGF-β1 appears to be age-dependent.

Studies show that neutralization of TGF-β1 in vitro inhibits the differentiation of helper T cells into T_{h}17 cells. The role of TGF-β1 in the generation of T_{h}17 cells goes against its dominant conceptualization as an anti-inflammatory cytokine; however, the shared requirement between inflammatory and anti-inflammatory immune cells suggests that an imbalance between these two cell types can be an important link to autoimmunity. Co-activation by IL-6 from activated dendritic cells, which serves to activate the transcription factor STAT3, is required in addition to TGF-β1 for the differentiation of T_{h}17 cells. However, the molecular mechanism of T_{h}17 differentiation is not well understood. Because T_{h}17 cells are distinct from T_{h}1 and T_{h}2 lineages in that they have been shown to be capable of regulatory functions, this is further evidence of TGF-β1's regulatory function in the immune system.

=== B lymphocytes ===
TGF-β has mainly inhibitory effects on B lymphocytes. TGF-β inhibits B cell proliferation. The exact mechanism is unknown, but there is evidence that TGF-β inhibits B cell proliferation by inducing the transcription factor Id3, inducing expression of cyclin-dependent kinase inhibitor 21 (a regulator of cell cycle progression through the G1 and S phase), and repressing other key regulatory genes such as c-myc and ATM. CD40, a key surface molecule in the activation of the innate immune response, can induce Smad7 expression to reverse the growth inhibition of B cells induced by TGF-β. TGF-β also blocks B cell activation and promotes class switching IgA in both human and mouse B cells and has an otherwise inhibitory function for antibody production.

TGF-β also induces apoptosis of immature or resting B cells; the mechanism is unknown, but may overlap with its anti-proliferation pathway. TGF-β has been shown to downregulate c-myc as it does in the inhibition of B cell proliferation. It is also known to induce NF-κB inhibitor IKBa, inhibiting NF-κB activation. NF-κB is a transcription factor that regulates the production of cytokines like IL-1, TNF-a, and defensins, although its function in apoptosis may be separate from this function.

=== Macrophages ===
The general consensus in the literature is that TGF-β stimulates resting monocytes and inhibits activated macrophages. For monocytes, TGF-β has been shown to function as a chemoattractant as well as an upregulator of anti-inflammatory response. However, TGF-β has also been shown to downregulate inflammatory cytokine production in monocytes and macrophages, likely by the aforementioned inhibition of NF-κB. This contradiction may be due to the fact that the effect of TGF-β has been shown to be highly context-dependent.

TGF-β is thought to play a role in alternative macrophage activation seen in lean mice, and these macrophages maintain an anti-inflammatory phenotype. This phenotype is lost in obese mice, who have not only more macrophages than lean mice but also classically activated macrophages which release TNF-α and other pro-inflammatory cytokines that contribute to a chronically pro-inflammatory milieu.

=== Cell cycle ===
TGF-β plays a crucial role in the regulation of the cell cycle by blocking progress through G_{1} phase. TGF-β causes synthesis of p15 and p21 proteins, which block the cyclin:CDK complex responsible for retinoblastoma protein (Rb) phosphorylation. Thus, TGF-β blocks advancement through the G_{1} phase of the cycle. In doing so, TGF-β suppresses expression of c-myc, a gene which is involved in G_{1} cell cycle progression.

== Clinical significance ==
=== Cancer ===
In normal cells, TGF-β, acting through its signaling pathway, stops the cell cycle at the G1 stage to stop proliferation, induce differentiation, or promote apoptosis. In many cancer cells, parts of the TGF-β signaling pathway are mutated, and TGF-β no longer controls the cell. These cancer cells proliferate. The surrounding stromal cells (fibroblasts) also proliferate. Both cells increase their production of TGF-β. This TGF-β acts on the surrounding stromal cells, immune cells, endothelial and smooth-muscle cells. It causes immunosuppression and angiogenesis, which makes the cancer more invasive.

TGF-β also converts effector T-cells, which normally attack cancer with an inflammatory (immune) reaction, into regulatory (suppressor) T-cells, which turn off the inflammatory reaction. Normal tissue integrity is preserved by feedback interactions between different cell types that express adhesion molecules and secrete cytokines. Disruption of these feedback mechanisms in cancer damages a tissue. When TGF-β signaling fails to control NF-κB activity in cancer cells, this has at least two potential effects: first, it enables the malignant tumor to persist in the presence of activated immune cells, and second, the cancer cell outlasts immune cells because it survives in the presence of apoptotic, and anti-inflammatory mediators.

Furthermore, forkhead box protein 3 (FOXP3) as a transcription factor is an essential molecular marker of regulatory T (T_{reg}) cells. FOXP3 polymorphism (rs3761548) might be involved in cancer progression like gastric cancer through influencing Tregs function and the secretion of immunomodulatory cytokines such as IL-10, IL-35, and TGF-β.

=== Liver fibrosis ===
TGF-β1 has been implicated in the process of activating hepatic stellate cells (HSCs) with the magnitude of hepatic fibrosis being in proportion to increase in TGF-β levels. Studies have shown that ACTA2 is associated with TGF-β pathway that enhances contractile properties of HSCs leading to liver fibrosis.

=== Tuberculosis ===
Mycobacterium tuberculosis infection, or tuberculosis, has been shown to result in increased levels of active TGF-β within the lung. Due to the broad range of suppressive effects of TGF-β on immune cells, computer modeling has predicted that TGF-β blockade may improve immune responses and infection outcome. Research in animal models has further shown that TGF-β impairs immune responses and elimination of TGF-β signaling results in an enhanced T cell response and lower bacterial burdens. Thus, therapies which block TGF-β may have the potential to improve therapy for tuberculosis.

=== Heart disease ===
One animal study suggests that cholesterol suppresses the responsiveness of cardiovascular cells to TGF-β and its protective qualities, thus allowing atherosclerosis and heart disease to develop, while statins, drugs that lower cholesterol levels, may enhance the responsiveness of cardiovascular cells to the protective actions of TGF-β.

TGF-β is involved in regeneration of zebrafish heart.

=== Marfan syndrome ===
TGF-β signaling also likely plays a major role in the pathogenesis of Marfan syndrome, a disease characterized by disproportionate height, arachnodactyly, ectopia lentis and heart complications such as mitral valve prolapse and aortic enlargement increasing the likelihood of aortic dissection. While the underlying defect in Marfan syndrome is faulty synthesis of the glycoprotein fibrillin I, normally an important component of elastic fibers, it has been shown that the Marfan syndrome phenotype can be relieved by addition of a TGF-β antagonist in affected mice. This suggests that while the symptoms of Marfan syndrome may seem consistent with a connective tissue disorder, the mechanism is more likely related to reduced sequestration of TGF-β by fibrillin.

=== Loeys–Dietz syndrome ===
TGF-β signaling is also disturbed in Loeys–Dietz syndrome which can be caused by mutations in TGF-β proteins, TGF-β receptor proteins, or TGF-β signaling second messengers like SMAD3.

=== Obesity and diabetes ===
TGF-β/SMAD3 signaling pathway is important in regulating glucose and energy homeostasis and might play a role in diabetic nephropathy.

As noted above in the section about macrophages, loss of TGF-β signaling in obesity is one contributor to the inflammatory milieu generated in the case of obesity.

=== Multiple sclerosis ===
Induced T regulatory cells (iTreg), stimulated by TGF-β in the presence of IL-2, suppressed the development of experimental autoimmune encephalomyelitis (EAE), an animal model of multiple sclerosis (MS) via a FOXP3 and IL-10 mediated response. This suggests a possible role for TGF-β and iTreg in the regulation and treatment of MS.

Decreased levels of TGF-β have been observed in patients diagnosed with multiple sclerosis. Its role in multiple sclerosis can be explained due to TGF-β role in regulating apoptosis of T_{h}17 cells. When TGF-β levels decrease, they are unable to induce T_{h}17 cells' apoptosis. T_{h}17 cells secrete TNF-α, which induces demyelination of the oligodendroglial via TNF receptor 1. The decreased TGF-β levels lead to increased T_{h}17 cells and subsequently increased TNFα levels. As a result, demyelination of neurons occurs. TGF-β have also been observed to induce oligodendrocyte (myelin sheath producing cells) growth. Hence, the decreased TGF-β levels during MS may also prevent remyelination of neurons.

=== Neurological ===
Higher concentrations of TGF-β are found in the blood and cerebrospinal fluid of patients with Alzheimer's disease as compared to control subjects, suggesting a possible role in the neurodegenerative cascade leading to Alzheimer's disease symptoms and pathology. The role of TGF-β in neuronal dysfunction remains an active area of research.

=== Other ===
Overactive TGF-β pathway, with an increase of TGF-β2, was reported in the studies of patients with keratoconus.

There is substantial evidence in animal and some human studies that TGF-β in breast milk may be a key immunoregulatory factor in the development of infant immune response, moderating the risk of atopic disease or autoimmunity.

Skin aging is caused in part by TGF-β, which reduces the subcutaneous fat that gives skin a pleasant appearance and texture. TGF-β does this by blocking the conversion of dermal fibroblasts into fat cells; with fewer fat cells underneath to provide support, the skin becomes saggy and wrinkled. Subcutaneous fat also produces cathelicidin, which is a peptide that fights bacterial infections.

== See also ==
- Anita Roberts, a molecular biologist who made pioneering observations of TGF-β
- Ziad Mallat, identified a major atheroprotective role of regulatory T cells and associated anti-inflammatory cytokines, IL-10 and TGF-β
