= Biochemical cascade =

Series of chemical reactions resulting in a cell response

A biochemical cascade, also known as a signaling cascade or signaling pathway, is a series of chemical reactions that occur within a biological cell when initiated by a stimulus. This stimulus, known as a first messenger, acts on a receptor that is transduced to the cell interior through second messengers which amplify the signal and transfer it to effector molecules, causing the cell to respond to the initial stimulus. Most biochemical cascades are series of events, in which one event triggers the next, in a linear fashion. At each step of the signaling cascade, various controlling factors are involved to regulate cellular actions, in order to respond effectively to cues about their changing internal and external environments.

An example would be the coagulation cascade of secondary hemostasis which leads to fibrin formation, and thus, the initiation of blood coagulation. Another example, sonic hedgehog signaling pathway, is one of the key regulators of embryonic development and is present in all bilaterians. Signaling proteins give cells information to make the embryo develop properly. When the pathway malfunctions, it can result in diseases like basal cell carcinoma. Recent studies point to the role of hedgehog signaling in regulating adult stem cells involved in maintenance and regeneration of adult tissues. The pathway has also been implicated in the development of some cancers. Drugs that specifically target hedgehog signaling to fight diseases are being actively developed by a number of pharmaceutical companies.

== Introduction ==
=== Signaling cascades ===
Cells require a full and functional cellular machinery to live. When they belong to complex multicellular organisms, they need to communicate among themselves and work for symbiosis in order to give life to the organism. These communications between cells triggers intracellular signaling cascades, termed signal transduction pathways, that regulate specific cellular functions. Each signal transduction occurs with a primary extracellular messenger that binds to a transmembrane or nuclear receptor, initiating intracellular signals. The complex formed produces or releases second messengers that integrate and adapt the signal, amplifying it, by activating molecular targets, which in turn trigger effectors that will lead to the desired cellular response.

=== Transductors and effectors ===
Signal transduction is realized by activation of specific receptors and consequent production/delivery of second messengers, such as Ca^{2+} or cAMP. These molecules operate as signal transducers, triggering intracellular cascades and in turn amplifying the initial signal. Two main signal transduction mechanisms have been identified, via nuclear receptors, or via transmembrane receptors. In the first one, first messenger cross through the cell membrane, binding and activating intracellular receptors localized at nucleus or cytosol, which then act as transcriptional factors regulating directly gene expression. This is possible due to the lipophilic nature of those ligands, mainly hormones. In the signal transduction via transmembrane receptors, the first messenger binds to the extracellular domain of transmembrane receptor, activating it. These receptors may have intrinsic catalytic activity or may be coupled to effector enzymes, or may also be associated to ionic channels. Therefore, there are four main transmembrane receptor types: G protein coupled receptors (GPCRs), tyrosine kinase receptors (RTKs), serine/threonine kinase receptors (RSTKs), and ligand-gated ion channels (LGICs). Second messengers can be classified into three classes:

1. Hydrophilic/cytosolic – are soluble in water and are localized at the cytosol, including cAMP, cGMP, IP3, Ca^{2+}, cADPR and S1P. Their main targets are protein kinases as PKA and PKG, being then involved in phosphorylation mediated responses.
2. Hydrophobic/membrane-associated – are insoluble in water and membrane-associated, being localized at intermembrane spaces, where they can bind to membrane-associated effector proteins. Examples: PIP3, DAG, phosphatidic acid, arachidonic acid and ceramide. They are involved in regulation of kinases and phosphatases, G protein associated factors and transcriptional factors.
3. Gaseous – can be widespread through cell membrane and cytosol, including nitric oxide and carbon monoxide. Both of them can activate cGMP and, besides of being capable of mediating independent activities, they also can operate in a coordinated mode.

=== Cellular response ===
The cellular response in signal transduction cascades involves alteration of the expression of effector genes or activation/inhibition of targeted proteins. Regulation of protein activity mainly involves phosphorylation/dephosphorylation events, leading to its activation or inhibition. It is the case for the vast majority of responses as a consequence of the binding of the primary messengers to membrane receptors. This response is quick, as it involves regulation of molecules that are already present in the cell. On the other hand, the induction or repression of the expression of genes requires the binding of transcriptional factors to the regulatory sequences of these genes. The transcriptional factors are activated by the primary messengers, in most cases, due to their function as nuclear receptors for these messengers. The secondary messengers like DAG or Ca^{2+} could also induce or repress gene expression, via transcriptional factors. This response is slower than the first because it involves more steps, like transcription of genes and then the effect of newly formed proteins in a specific target. The target could be a protein or another gene.

=== Examples of biochemical cascades ===
In biochemistry, several important enzymatic cascades and signal transduction cascades participate in metabolic pathways or signaling networks, in which enzymes are usually involved to catalyze the reactions. For example, the tissue factor pathway in the coagulation cascade of secondary hemostasis is the primary pathway leading to fibrin formation, and thus, the initiation of blood coagulation. The pathways are a series of reactions, in which a zymogen (inactive enzyme precursor) of a serine protease and its glycoprotein co-factors are activated to become active components that then catalyze the next reaction in the cascade, ultimately resulting in cross-linked fibrin.

Another example, sonic hedgehog signaling pathway, is one of the key regulators of embryonic development and is present in all bilaterians. Different parts of the embryo have different concentrations of hedgehog signaling proteins, which give cells information to make the embryo develop properly and correctly into a head or a tail. When the pathway malfunctions, it can result in diseases like basal cell carcinoma. Recent studies point to the role of hedgehog signaling in regulating adult stem cells involved in maintenance and regeneration of adult tissues. The pathway has also been implicated in the development of some cancers. Drugs that specifically target hedgehog signaling to fight diseases are being actively developed by a number of pharmaceutical companies. Most biochemical cascades are series of events, in which one event triggers the next, in a linear fashion.

Biochemical cascades include:

- The Complement system
- The Insulin Signaling Pathway
- The Sonic hedgehog Signaling Pathway
- The Wnt signaling pathway
- The JAK-STAT signaling pathway
- The Adrenergic receptor Pathways
- The Acetylcholine receptor Pathways
- The Mitogen-activated protein kinase cascade

Conversely, negative cascades include events that are in a circular fashion, or can cause or be caused by multiple events. Negative cascades include:

- Ischemic cascade

== Cell-specific biochemical cascades ==
=== Epithelial cells ===
Adhesion is an essential process to epithelial cells so that epithelium can be formed and cells can be in permanent contact with extracellular matrix and other cells. Several pathways exist to accomplish this communication and adhesion with environment. But the main signalling pathways are the cadherin and integrin pathways. The cadherin pathway is present in adhesion junctions or in desmosomes and it is responsible for epithelial adhesion and communication with adjacent cells. Cadherin is a transmembrane glycoprotein receptor that establishes contact with another cadherin present in the surface of a neighbour cell forming an adhesion complex. This adhesion complex is formed by β-catenin and α-catenin, and p120^{CAS} is essential for its stabilization and regulation. This complex then binds to actin, leading to polymerization. For actin polymerization through the cadherin pathway, proteins of the Rho GTPases family are also involved. This complex is regulated by phosphorylation, which leads to downregulation of adhesion. Several factors can induce the phosphorylation, like EGF, HGF or v-Src. The cadherin pathway also has an important function in survival and proliferation because it regulates the concentration of cytoplasmic β-catenin. When β-catenin is free in the cytoplasm, normally it is degraded, however if the Wnt signalling is activated, β-catenin degradation is inhibited and it is translocated to the nucleus where it forms a complex with transcription factors. This leads to activation of genes responsible for cell proliferation and survival. So the cadherin-catenin complex is essential for cell fate regulation. Integrins are heterodimeric glycoprotein receptors that recognize proteins present in the extracellular matrix, like fibronectin and laminin. In order to function, integrins have to form complexes with ILK and Fak proteins. For adhesion to the extracellular matrix, ILK activate the Rac and Cdc42 proteins and leading to actin polymerization. ERK also leads to actin polymerization through activation of cPLA2. Recruitment of FAK by integrin leads to Akt activation and this inhibits pro-apoptotic factors like BAD and Bax. When adhesion through integrins do not occur the pro-apoptotic factors are not inhibited and resulting in apoptosis.

=== Hepatocytes ===
The hepatocyte is a complex and multifunctional differentiated cell whose cell response will be influenced by the zone in hepatic lobule, because concentrations of oxygen and toxic substances present in the hepatic sinusoids change from periportal zone to centrilobular zone10. The hepatocytes of the intermediate zone have the appropriate morphological and functional features since they have the environment with average concentrations of oxygen and other substances. This specialized cell is capable of:

- Regulate glucose metabolism
1. Via cAMP/PKA/TORC (transducers of regulated CREB)/CRE, PIP3 /PKB and PLC /IP3
2. Expression of enzymes for synthesis, storage and distribution of glucose
- Synthesis of acute phase proteins
1. Via JAK /STAT /APRE (acute phase response element)
2. Expression of C-reactive protein, globulin protease inhibitors, complement, coagulation and fibrinolytic systems and iron homeostasis
- Regulate iron homeostasis (acute phase independent)
1. Via Smads /HAMP
2. Hepcidin expression
- Regulate lipid metabolism
1. Via LXR /LXRE (LXR response element)
2. Expression of ApoE CETP, FAS and LPL
- Exocrine production of bile salts and other compounds
1. Via LXR /LXRE
2. Expression of CYP7A1 and ABC transporters
- Degradate of toxic substances
1. Via LXR /LXRE
2. Expression of ABC transporters
- Endocrine production
1. Via JAK/STAT /GHRE (growth hormone response element)

IGF-1 and IGFBP-3 expression

1. Via THR/THRE (thyroid hormone response element)

Angiotensinogen expression

- Regenerate itself by hepatocyte mitosis
1. Via STAT and Gab1: RAS/MAPK, PLC/IP3 and PI3K/FAK
2. Cell growth, proliferation, survival, invasion and motility

The hepatocyte also regulates other functions for constitutive synthesis of proteins (albumin, ALT and AST) that influences the synthesis or activation of other molecules (synthesis of urea and essential amino acids), activate vitamin D, utilization of vitamin K, transporter expression of vitamin A and conversion of thyroxine.

=== Neurons ===
Purinergic signalling has an essential role at interactions between neurons and glia cells, allowing these to detect action potentials and modulate neuronal activity, contributing for intra and extracellular homeostasis regulation. Besides purinergic neurotransmitter, ATP acts as a trophic factor at cellular development and growth, being involved on microglia activation and migration, and also on axonal myelination by oligodendrocytes. There are two main types of purinergic receptors, P1 binding to adenosine, and P2 binding to ATP or ADP, presenting different signalling cascades. The Nrf2/ARE signalling pathway has a fundamental role at fighting against oxidative stress, to which neurons are especially vulnerable due to its high oxygen consumption and high lipid content. This neuroprotective pathway involves control of neuronal activity by perisynaptic astrocytes and neuronal glutamate release, with the establishment of tripartite synapses. The Nrf2/ARE activation leads to a higher expression of enzymes involved in glutathione syntheses and metabolism, that have a key role in antioxidant response. The LKB1/NUAK1 signalling pathway regulates terminal axon branching at cortical neurons, via local immobilized mitochondria capture. Besides NUAK1, LKB1 kinase acts under other effectors enzymes as SAD-A/B and MARK, therefore regulating neuronal polarization and axonal growth, respectively. These kinase cascades implicates also Tau and others MAP. An extended knowledge of these and others neuronal pathways could provide new potential therapeutic targets for several neurodegenerative chronic diseases as Alzheimer's, Parkinson's and Huntington's disease, and also amyotrophic lateral sclerosis.

=== Blood cells ===
The blood cells (erythrocytes, leukocytes and platelets) are produced by hematopoiesis. The erythrocytes have as main function the O_{2} delivery to the tissues, and this transfer occurs by diffusion and is determined by the O_{2} tension (PO_{2}). The erythrocyte is able to feel the tissue need for O_{2} and cause a change in vascular caliber, through the pathway of ATP release, which requires an increase in cAMP, and are regulated by the phosphodiesterase (PDE). This pathway can be triggered via two mechanisms: physiological stimulus (like reduced O2 tension) and activation of the prostacyclin receptor (IPR). This pathway includes heterotrimeric G proteins, adenylyl cyclase (AC), protein kinase A (PKA), cystic fibrosis transmembrane conductance regulator (CFTR), and a final conduit that transport ATP to vascular lumen (pannexin 1 or voltage-dependent anion channel (VDAC)). The released ATP acts on purinergic receptors on endothelial cells, triggering the synthesis and release of several vasodilators, like nitric oxide (NO) and prostacyclin (PGI_{2}). The current model of leukocyte adhesion cascade includes many steps mentioned in Table 1. The integrin-mediated adhesion of leukocytes to endothelial cells is related with morphological changes in both leukocytes and endothelial cells, which together support leukocyte migration through the venular walls. Rho and Ras small GTPases are involved in the principal leukocyte signaling pathways underlying chemokine-stimulated integrin-dependent adhesion, and have important roles in regulating cell shape, adhesion and motility.

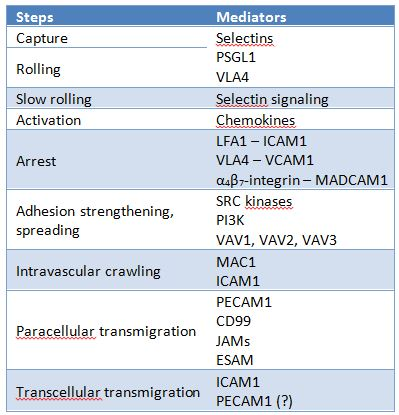
The leukocyte adhesion cascade steps and the key molecules involved in each step

After a vascular injury occurs, platelets are activated by locally exposed collagen (glycoprotein (GP) VI receptor), locally generated thrombin (PAR1 and PAR4 receptors), platelet-derived thromboxane A2 (TxA2) (TP receptor) and ADP (P2Y1 and P2Y12 receptors) that is either released from damaged cells or secreted from platelet dense granules. The von Willebrand factor (VWF) serves as an essential accessory molecule. In general terms, platelet activation initiated by agonist takes to a signaling cascade that leads to an increase of the cytosolic calcium concentration. Consequently, the integrin α_{IIb}β_{3} is activated and the binding to fibrinogen allows the aggregation of platelets to each other. The increase of cytosolic calcium also leads to shape change and TxA2 synthesis, leading to signal amplification.

=== Lymphocytes ===
The main goal of biochemical cascades in lymphocytes is the secretion of molecules that can suppress altered cells or eliminate pathogenic agents, through proliferation, differentiation and activation of these cells. Therefore, the antigenic receptors play a central role in signal transduction in lymphocytes, because when antigens interact with them lead to a cascade of signal events. These receptors, that recognize the antigen soluble (B cells) or linked to a molecule on Antigen Presenting Cells (T cells), do not have long cytoplasm tails, so they are anchored to signal proteins, which contain a long cytoplasmic tails with a motif that can be phosphorylated (ITAM – immunoreceptor tyrosine-based activation motif) and resulting in different signal pathways. The antigen receptor and signal protein form a stable complex, named BCR or TCR, in B or T cells, respectively. The family Src is essential for signal transduction in these cells, because it is responsible for phosphorylation of ITAMs. Therefore, Lyn and Lck, in lymphocytes B and T, respectively, phosphorylate immunoreceptor tyrosine-based activation motifs after the antigen recognition and the conformational change of the receptor, which leads to the binding of Syk/Zap-70 kinases to ITAM and its activation. Syk kinase is specific of lymphocytes B and Zap-70 is present in T cells. After activation of these enzymes, some adaptor proteins are phosphorylated, like BLNK (B cells) and LAT (T cells). These proteins after phosphorylation become activated and allow binding of others enzymes that continue the biochemical cascade. One example of a protein that binds to adaptor proteins and become activated is PLC that is very important in the lymphocyte signal pathways. PLC is responsible for PKC activation, via DAG and Ca^{2+}, which leads to phosphorylation of CARMA1 molecule, and formation of CBM complex. This complex activates Iκκ kinase, which phosphorylates I-κB, and then allows the translocation of NF-κB to the nucleus and transcription of genes encoding cytokines, for example. Others transcriptional factors like NFAT and AP1 complex are also important for transcription of cytokines. The differentiation of B cells to plasma cells is also an example of a signal mechanism in lymphocytes, induced by a cytokine receptor. In this case, some interleukins bind to a specific receptor, which leads to activation of MAPK/ERK pathway. Consequently, the BLIMP1 protein is translated and inhibits PAX5, allowing immunoglobulin genes transcription and activation of XBP1 (important for the secretory apparatus formation and enhancing of protein synthesis). Also, the coreceptors (CD28/CD19) play an important role because they can improve the antigen/receptor binding and initiate parallel cascade events, like activation o PI3 Kinase. PIP3 then is responsible for activation of several proteins, like vav (leads to activation of JNK pathway, which consequently leads to activation of c-Jun) and btk (can also activate PLC).

=== Bones ===
==== Wnt signaling pathway ====
The Wnt signaling pathway can be divided in canonical and non-canonical. The canonical signaling involves binding of Wnt to Frizzled and LRP5 co-receptor, leading to GSK3 phosphorylation and inhibition of β-catenin degradation, resulting in its accumulation and translocation to the nucleus, where it acts as a transcription factor. The non-canonical Wnt signaling can be divided in planar cell polarity (PCP) pathway and Wnt/calcium pathway. It is characterized by binding of Wnt to Frizzled and activation of G proteins and to an increase of intracellular levels of calcium through mechanisms involving PKC 50. The Wnt signaling pathway plays a significant role in osteoblastogenesis and bone formation, inducing the differentiation of mesenquimal pluripotent cells in osteoblasts and inhibiting the RANKL/RANK pathway and osteoclastogenesis.

==== RANKL/RANK signaling pathway ====
RANKL is a member of the TNF superfamily of ligands. Through binding to the RANK receptor it activates various molecules, like NF-kappa B, MAPK, NFAT and PI3K52. The RANKL/RANK signaling pathway regulates osteoclastogenesis, as well as, the survival and activation of osteoclasts.

==== Adenosine signaling pathway ====
Adenosine is very relevant in bone metabolism, as it plays a role in formation and activation of both osteoclasts and osteoblasts. Adenosine acts by binding to purinergic receptors and influencing adenylyl cyclase activity and the formation of cAMP and PKA 54. Adenosine may have opposite effects on bone metabolism, because while certain purinergic receptors stimulate adenylyl cyclase activity, others have the opposite effect. Under certain circumstances adenosine stimulates bone destruction and in other situations it promotes bone formation, depending on the purinergic receptor that is being activated.

=== Stem cells ===
Self-renewal and differentiation abilities are exceptional properties of stem cells. These cells can be classified by their differentiation capacity, which progressively decrease with development, in totipotents, pluripotents, multipotents and unipotents.

Self-renewal process is highly regulated from cell cycle and genetic transcription control. There are some signaling pathways, such as LIF/JAK/STAT3 (Leukemia inhibitory factor/Janus kinase/Signal transducer and activator of transcription 3) and BMP/SMADs/Id (Bone morphogenetic proteins/ Mothers against decapentaplegic/ Inhibitor of differentiation), mediated by transcription factors, epigenetic regulators and others components, and they are responsible for self-renewal genes expression and inhibition of differentiation genes expression, respectively.

At cell cycle level there is an increase of complexity of the mechanisms in somatic stem cells. However, it is observed a decrease of self-renewal potential with age. These mechanisms are regulated by p16^{Ink4a}-CDK4/6-Rb and p19^{Arf}-p53-P21^{Cip1} signaling pathways. Embryonic stem cells have constitutive cyclin E-CDK2 activity, which hyperphosphorylates and inactivates Rb. This leads to a short G1 phase of the cell cycle with rapid G1-S transition and little dependence on mitogenic signals or D cyclins for S phase entry. In fetal stem cells, mitogens promote a relatively rapid G1-S transition through cooperative action of cyclin D-CDK4/6 and cyclin E-CDK2 to inactivate Rb family proteins. p16^{Ink4a} and p19^{Arf} expression are inhibited by Hmga2-dependent chromatin regulation. Many young adult stem cells are quiescent most of the time. In the absence of mitogenic signals, cyclin-CDKs and the G1-S transition are suppressed by cell cycle inhibitors including Ink4 and Cip/Kip family proteins. As a result, Rb is hypophosphorylated and inhibits E2F, promoting quiescence in G0-phase of the cell cycle. Mitogen stimulation mobilizes these cells into cycle by activating cyclin D expression. In old adult stem cells, let-7 microRNA expression increases, reducing Hmga2 levels and increasing p16^{Ink4a} and p19^{Arf} levels. This reduces the sensitivity of stem cells to mitogenic signals by inhibiting cyclin-CDK complexes. As a result, either stem cells cannot enter the cell cycle, or cell division slows in many tissues.

Extrinsic regulation is made by signals from the niche, where stem cells are found, which is able to promote quiescent state and cell cycle activation in somatic stem cells. Asymmetric division is characteristic of somatic stem cells, maintaining the reservoir of stem cells in the tissue and production of specialized cells of the same.

Stem cells show an elevated therapeutic potential, mainly in hemato-oncologic pathologies, such as leukemia and lymphomas. Little groups of stem cells were found into tumours, calling cancer stem cells. There are evidences that these cells promote tumor growth and metastasis.

=== Oocytes ===
The oocyte is the female cell involved in reproduction. There is a close relationship between the oocyte and the surrounding follicular cells which is crucial to the development of both. GDF9 and BMP15 produced by the oocyte bind to BMPR2 receptors on follicular cells activating SMADs 2/3, ensuring follicular development. Concomitantly, oocyte growth is initiated by binding of KITL to its receptor KIT in the oocyte, leading to the activation of PI3K/Akt pathway, allowing oocyte survival and development. During embryogenesis, oocytes initiate meiosis and stop in prophase I. This arrest is maintained by elevated levels of cAMP within the oocyte. It was recently suggested that cGMP cooperates with cAMP to maintain the cell cycle arrest. During meiotic maturation, the LH peak that precedes ovulation activates MAPK pathway leading to gap junction disruption and breakdown of communication between the oocyte and the follicular cells. PDE3A is activated and degrades cAMP, leading to cell cycle progression and oocyte maturation. The LH surge also leads to the production of progesterone and prostaglandins that induce the expression of ADAMTS1 and other proteases, as well as their inhibitors. This will lead to degradation of the follicular wall, but limiting the damage and ensuring that the rupture occurs in the appropriate location, releasing the oocyte into the fallopian tubes. Oocyte activation depends on fertilization by sperm. It is initiated with sperm's attraction induced by prostaglandins produced by the oocyte, which will create a gradient that will influence the sperm's direction and velocity. After fusion with the oocyte, PLC ζ of the spermatozoa is released into the oocyte leading to an increase in Ca2+ levels that will activate CaMKII which will degrade MPF, leading to the resumption of meiosis. The increased Ca^{2+} levels will induce the exocytosis of cortical granules that degrade ZP receptors, used by sperm to penetrate the oocyte, blocking polyspermy. Deregulation of these pathways will lead to several diseases like, oocyte maturation failure syndrome which results in infertility. Increasing our molecular knowledge of oocyte development mechanisms could improve the outcome of assisted reproduction procedures, facilitating conception.

=== Spermatozoon ===
Spermatozoon is the male gamete. After ejaculation this cell is not mature, so it can not fertilize the oocyte. To have the ability to fertilize the female gamete, this cell suffers capacitation and acrosome reaction in female reproductive tract. The signaling pathways best described for spermatozoon involve these processes. The cAMP/PKA signaling pathway leads to sperm cells capacitation; however, adenylyl cyclase in sperm cells is different from the somatic cells. Adenylyl cyclase in spermatozoon does not recognize G proteins, so it is stimulated by bicarbonate and Ca^{2+} ions. Then, it converts adenosine triphosphate into cyclic AMP, which activates Protein kinase A. PKA leads to protein tyrosine phosphorylation. Phospholipase C (PLC) is involved in acrosome reaction. ZP3 is a glycoprotein present in zona pelucida and it interacts with receptors in spermatozoon. So, ZP3 can activate G protein coupled receptors and tyrosine kinase receptors, that leads to production of PLC. PLC cleaves the phospholipid phosphatidylinositol 4,5-bisphosphate (PIP2) into diacyl glycerol (DAG) and inositol 1,4,5-trisphosphate. IP3 is released as a soluble structure into the cytosol and DAG remains bound to the membrane. IP3 binds to IP3 receptors, present in acrosome membrane. In addition, calcium and DAG together work to activate protein kinase C, which goes on to phosphorylate other molecules, leading to altered cellular activity. These actions cause an increase in cytosolic concentration of Ca^{2+} that leads to dispersion of actin and consequently promotes plasmatic membrane and outer acrosome membrane fusion. Progesterone is a steroid hormone produced in cumulus oophorus. In somatic cells it binds to receptors in nucleus; however, in spermatozoon its receptors are present in plasmatic membrane. This hormone activates AKT that leads to activation of other protein kinases, involved in capacitation and acrosome reaction. When ROS (reactive oxygen species) are present in high concentration, they can affect the physiology of cells, but when they are present in moderated concentration they are important for acrosome reaction and capacitation. ROS can interact with cAMP/PKA and progesterone pathway, stimulating them. ROS also interacts with ERK pathway that leads to activation of Ras, MEK and MEK-like proteins. These proteins activate protein tyrosine kinase (PTK) that phosphorylates various proteins important for capacitation and acrosome reaction.

=== Embryos ===
Various signalling pathways, as FGF, WNT and TGF-β pathways, regulate the processes involved in embryogenesis.

FGF (Fibroblast Growth Factor) ligands bind to receptors tyrosine kinase, FGFR (Fibroblast Growth Factor Receptors), and form a stable complex with co-receptors HSPG (Heparan Sulphate Proteoglycans) that will promote autophosphorylation of the intracellular domain of FGFR and consequent activation of four main pathways: MAPK/ERK, PI3K, PLCγ and JAK/STAT.

- MAPK/ERK (Mitogen-Activated Protein Kinase/Extracellular Signal-Regulated Kinase) regulates gene transcription through successive kinase phosphorylation and in human embryonic stem cells it helps maintaining pluripotency. However, in the presence of Activin A, a TGF-β ligand, it causes the formation of mesoderm and neuroectoderm.
- Phosphorylation of membrane phospholipids by PI3K (Phosphatidylinositol 3-Kinase) results in activation of AKT/PKB (Protein Kinase B). This kinase is involved in cell survival and inhibition of apoptosis, cellular growth and maintenance of pluripotency, in embryonic stem cells.
- PLCγ (Phosphoinositide Phospholipase C γ) hydrolyzes membrane phospholipids to form IP3 (Inositoltriphosphate) and DAG (Diacylglycerol), leading to activation of kinases and regulating morphogenic movements during gastrulation and neurulation.
- STAT (Signal Trandsducer and Activator of Transcription) is phosphorylated by JAK (Janus Kinase) and regulates gene transcription, determining cell fates. In mouse embryonic stem cells, this pathway helps maintaining pluripotency.

The WNT pathway allows β-catenin function in gene transcription, once the interaction between WNT ligand and G protein-coupled receptor Frizzled inhibits GSK-3 (Glycogen Synthase Kinase-3) and thus formation of β-catenin destruction complex. Although there is some controversy about the effects of this pathway in embryogenesis, it is thought that WNT signalling induces primitive streak, mesoderm and endoderm formation. In TGF-β (Transforming Growth Factor β) pathway, BMP (Bone Morphogenic Protein), Activin and Nodal ligands bind to their receptors and activate Smads that bind to DNA and promote gene transcription. Activin is necessary for mesoderm and specially endoderm differentiation, and Nodal and BMP are involved in embryo patterning. BMP is also responsible for formation of extra-embryonic tissues before and during gastrulation, and for early mesoderm differentiation, when Activin and FGF pathways are activated.

== Pathway construction ==
Pathway building has been performed by individual groups studying a network of interest (e.g., immune signaling pathway) as well as by large bioinformatics consortia (e.g., the Reactome Project) and commercial entities (e.g., Ingenuity Systems). Pathway building is the process of identifying and integrating the entities, interactions, and associated annotations, and populating the knowledge base. Pathway construction can have either a data-driven objective (DDO) or a knowledge-driven objective (KDO). Data-driven pathway construction is used to generate relationship information of genes or proteins identified in a specific experiment such as a microarray study. Knowledge-driven pathway construction entails development of a detailed pathway knowledge base for particular domains of interest, such as a cell type, disease, or system. The curation process of a biological pathway entails identifying and structuring content, mining information manually and/or computationally, and assembling a knowledgebase using appropriate software tools. A schematic illustrating the major steps involved in the data-driven and knowledge-driven construction processes.

For either DDO or KDO pathway construction, the first step is to mine pertinent information from relevant information sources about the entities and interactions. The information retrieved is assembled using appropriate formats, information standards, and pathway building tools to obtain a pathway prototype. The pathway is further refined to include context-specific annotations such as species, cell/tissue type, or disease type. The pathway can then be verified by the domain experts and updated by the curators based on appropriate feedback. Recent attempts to improve knowledge integration have led to refined classifications of cellular entities, such as GO, and to the assembly of structured knowledge repositories. Data repositories, which contain information regarding sequence data, metabolism, signaling, reactions, and interactions are a major source of information for pathway building. A few useful databases are described in the following table.

Database	Curation Type	GO Annotation (Y/N)	Description
1. Protein-protein interactions databases			
BIND	Manual Curation	N	200,000 documented biomolecular interactions and complexes
MINT	Manual Curation	N	Experimentally verified interactions
HPRD	Manual Curation	N	Elegant and comprehensive presentation of the interactions, entities and evidences
MPact	Manual and Automated Curation	N	Yeast interactions. A part of MIPS
DIP	Manual and Automated Curation	Y	Experimentally determined interactions
IntAct	Manual Curation	Y	Database and analysis system of binary and multi-protein interactions
PDZBase	Manual Curation	N	PDZ Domain containing proteins
GNPV	Manual and Automated Curation	Y	Based on specific experiments and literature
BioGrid	Manual Curation	Y	Physical and genetic interactions
UniHi	Manual and Automated Curation	Y	Comprehensive human protein interactions
OPHID	Manual Curation	Y	Combines PPI from BIND, HPRD, and MINT
2. Metabolic Pathway databases			
EcoCyc	Manual and Automated Curation	Y	Entire genome and biochemical machinery of E. Coli
MetaCyc	Manual Curation	N	Pathways of over 165 species
HumanCyc	Manual and Automated Curation	N	Human metabolic pathways and the human genome
BioCyc	Manual and Automated Curation	N	Collection of databases for several organism
3. Signaling Pathway databases			
KEGG	Manual Curation	Y	Comprehensive collection of pathways such as human disease, signaling, genetic information processing pathways. Links to several useful databases
PANTHER	Manual Curation	N	Compendium of metabolic and signaling pathways built using CellDesigner. Pathways can be downloaded in SBML format
Reactome	Manual Curation	Y	Hierarchical layout. Extensive links to relevant databases such as NCBI, ENSEMBL, UNIPROT, HAPMAP, KEGG, CHEBI, PubMed, GO. Follows PSI-MI standards
Biomodels	Manual Curation	Y	Domain experts curated biological connection maps and associated mathematical models
STKE	Manual Curation	N	Repository of canonical pathways
Ingenuity Systems	Manual Curation	Y	Commercial mammalian biological knowledgebase about genes, drugs, chemical, cellular and disease processes, and signaling and metabolic pathways
Human signaling network	Manual Curation	Y	Literature-curated human signaling network, the largest human signaling network database
PID	Manual Curation	Y	Compendium of several highly structured, assembled signaling pathways
BioPP	Manual and Automated Curation	Y	Repository of biological pathways built using CellDesigner

Legend: Y – Yes, N – No; BIND – Biomolecular Interaction Network Database, DIP – Database of Interacting Proteins, GNPV – Genome Network Platform Viewer, HPRD = Human Protein Reference Database, MINT – Molecular Interaction database, MIPS – Munich Information center for Protein Sequences, UNIHI – Unified Human Interactome, OPHID – Online Predicted Human Interaction Database, EcoCyc – Encyclopaedia of E. Coli Genes and Metabolism, MetaCyc – aMetabolic Pathway database, KEGG – Kyoto Encyclopedia of Genes and Genomes, PANTHER – Protein Analysis Through Evolutionary Relationship database, STKE – Signal Transduction Knowledge Environment, PID – The Pathway Interaction Database, BioPP – Biological Pathway Publisher. A comprehensive list of resources can be found at http://www.pathguide.org.

== Pathway-related databases and tools ==
=== KEGG ===
The increasing amount of genomic and molecular information is the basis for understanding higher-order biological systems, such as the cell and the organism, and their interactions with the environment, as well as for medical, industrial and other practical applications. The KEGG resource provides a reference knowledge base for linking genomes to biological systems, categorized as building blocks in the genomic space (KEGG GENES), the chemical space (KEGG LIGAND), wiring diagrams of interaction networks and reaction networks (KEGG PATHWAY), and ontologies for pathway reconstruction (BRITE database). The KEGG PATHWAY database is a collection of manually drawn pathway maps for metabolism, genetic information processing, environmental information processing such as signal transduction, ligand–receptor interaction and cell communication, various other cellular processes and human diseases, all based on extensive survey of published literature.

=== GenMAPP ===
Gene Map Annotator and Pathway Profiler (GenMAPP) a free, open-source, stand-alone computer program is designed for organizing, analyzing, and sharing genome scale data in the context of biological pathways. GenMAPP database support multiple gene annotations and species as well as custom species database creation for a potentially unlimited number of species. Pathway resources are expanded by utilizing homology information to translate pathway content between species and extending existing pathways with data derived from conserved protein interactions and coexpression. A new mode of data visualization including time-course, single nucleotide polymorphism (SNP), and splicing, has been implemented with GenMAPP database to support analysis of complex data. GenMAPP also offers innovative ways to display and share data by incorporating HTML export of analyses for entire sets of pathways as organized web pages. In short, GenMAPP provides a means to rapidly interrogate complex experimental data for pathway-level changes in a diverse range of organisms.

=== Reactome ===
Given the genetic makeup of an organism, the complete set of possible reactions constitutes its reactome. Reactome, located at http://www.reactome.org is a curated, peer-reviewed resource of human biological processes/pathway data. The basic unit of the Reactome database is a reaction; reactions are then grouped into causal chains to form pathways The Reactome data model allows us to represent many diverse processes in the human system, including the pathways of intermediary metabolism, regulatory pathways, and signal transduction, and high-level processes, such as the cell cycle. Reactome provides a qualitative framework, on which quantitative data can be superimposed. Tools have been developed to facilitate custom data entry and annotation by expert biologists, and to allow visualization and exploration of the finished dataset as an interactive process map. Although the primary curational domain is pathways from Homo sapiens, electronic projections of human pathways onto other organisms are regularly created via putative orthologs, thus making Reactome relevant to model organism research communities. The database is publicly available under open source terms, which allows both its content and its software infrastructure to be freely used and redistributed. Studying whole transcriptional profiles and cataloging protein–protein interactions has yielded much valuable biological information, from the genome or proteome to the physiology of an organism, an organ, a tissue or even a single cell. The Reactome database containing a framework of possible reactions which, when combined with expression and enzyme kinetic data, provides the infrastructure for quantitative models, therefore, an integrated view of biological processes, which links such gene products and can be systematically mined by using bioinformatics applications. Reactome data available in a variety of standard formats, including BioPAX, SBML and PSI-MI, and also enable data exchange with other pathway databases, such as the Cycs, KEGG and amaze, and molecular interaction databases, such as BIND and HPRD. The next data release will cover apoptosis, including the death receptor signaling pathways, and the Bcl2 pathways, as well as pathways involved in hemostasis. Other topics currently under development include several signaling pathways, mitosis, visual phototransduction and hematopoeisis. In summary, Reactome provides high-quality curated summaries of fundamental biological processes in humans in a form of biologist-friendly visualization of pathways data, and is an open-source project.

== Pathway-oriented approaches ==
In the post-genomic age, high-throughput sequencing and gene/protein profiling techniques have transformed biological research by enabling comprehensive monitoring of a biological system, yielding a list of differentially expressed genes or proteins, which is useful in identifying genes that may have roles in a given phenomenon or phenotype. With DNA microarrays and genome-wide gene engineering, it is possible to screen global gene expression profiles to contribute a wealth of genomic data to the public domain. With RNA interference, it is possible to distill the inferences contained in the experimental literature and primary databases into knowledge bases that consist of annotated representations of biological pathways. In this case, individual genes and proteins are known to be involved in biological processes, components, or structures, as well as how and where gene products interact with each other. Pathway-oriented approaches for analyzing microarray data, by grouping long lists of individual genes, proteins, and/or other biological molecules according to the pathways they are involved in into smaller sets of related genes or proteins, which reduces the complexity, have proven useful for connecting genomic data to specific biological processes and systems. Identifying active pathways that differ between two conditions can have more explanatory power than a simple list of different genes or proteins. In addition, a large number of pathway analytic methods exploit pathway knowledge in public repositories such as Gene Ontology (GO) or Kyoto Encyclopedia of Genes and Genomes (KEGG), rather than inferring pathways from molecular measurements. Furthermore, different research focuses have given the word "pathway" different meanings. For example, 'pathway' can denote a metabolic pathway involving a sequence of enzyme-catalyzed reactions of small molecules, or a signaling pathway involving a set of protein phosphorylation reactions and gene regulation events. Therefore, the term "pathway analysis" has a very broad application. For instance, it can refer to the analysis physical interaction networks (e.g., protein–protein interactions), kinetic simulation of pathways, and steady-state pathway analysis (e.g., flux-balance analysis), as well as its usage in the inference of pathways from expression and sequence data. Several functional enrichment analysis tools and algorithms have been developed to enhance data interpretation. The existing knowledge base–driven pathway analysis methods in each generation have been summarized in recent literature.

== Applications of pathway analysis in medicine ==
=== Colorectal cancer (CRC) ===
A program package MatchMiner was used to scan HUGO names for cloned genes of interest are scanned, then are input into GoMiner, which leveraged the GO to identify the biological processes, functions and components represented in the gene profile. Also, Database for Annotation, Visualization, and Integrated Discovery (DAVID) and KEGG database can be used for the analysis of microarray expression data and the analysis of each GO biological process (P), cellular component (C), and molecular function (F) ontology. In addition, DAVID tools can be used to analyze the roles of genes in metabolic pathways and show the biological relationships between genes or gene-products and may represent metabolic pathways. These two databases also provide bioinformatics tools online to combine specific biochemical information on a certain organism and facilitate the interpretation of biological meanings for experimental data. By using a combined approach of Microarray-Bioinformatic technologies, a potential metabolic mechanism contributing to colorectal cancer (CRC) has been demonstrated Several environmental factors may be involved in a series of points along the genetic pathway to CRC. These include genes associated with bile acid metabolism, glycolysis metabolism and fatty acid metabolism pathways, supporting a hypothesis that some metabolic alternations observed in colon carcinoma may occur in the development of CRC.

=== Parkinson's disease (PD) ===
Cellular models are instrumental in dissecting a complex pathological process into simpler molecular events. Parkinson's disease (PD) is multifactorial and clinically heterogeneous; the aetiology of the sporadic (and most common) form is still unclear and only a few molecular mechanisms have been clarified so far in the neurodegenerative cascade. In such a multifaceted picture, it is particularly important to identify experimental models that simplify the study of the different networks of proteins and genes involved. Cellular models that reproduce some of the features of the neurons that degenerate in PD have contributed to many advances in our comprehension of the pathogenic flow of the disease. In particular, the pivotal biochemical pathways (i.e. apoptosis and oxidative stress, mitochondrial impairment and dysfunctional mitophagy, unfolded protein stress and improper removal of misfolded proteins) have been widely explored in cell lines, challenged with toxic insults or genetically modified. The central role of a-synuclein has generated many models aiming to elucidate its contribution to the dysregulation of various cellular processes. Classical cellular models appear to be the correct choice for preliminary studies on the molecular action of new drugs or potential toxins and for understanding the role of single genetic factors. Moreover, the availability of novel cellular systems, such as cybrids or induced pluripotent stem cells, offers the chance to exploit the advantages of an in vitro investigation, although mirroring more closely the cell population being affected.

=== Alzheimer's disease (AD) ===
Synaptic degeneration and death of nerve cells are defining features of Alzheimer's disease (AD), the most prevalent age-related neurodegenerative disorders. In AD, neurons in the hippocampus and basal forebrain (brain regions that subserve learning and memory functions) are selectively vulnerable. Studies of postmortem brain tissue from AD people have provided evidence for increased levels of oxidative stress, mitochondrial dysfunction and impaired glucose uptake in vulnerable neuronal populations. Studies of animal and cell culture models of AD suggest that increased levels of oxidative stress (membrane lipid peroxidation, in particular) may disrupt neuronal energy metabolism and ion homeostasis, by impairing the function of membrane ion-motive ATPases, glucose and glutamate transporters. Such oxidative and metabolic compromise may thereby render neurons vulnerable to excitotoxicity and apoptosis. Recent studies suggest that AD can manifest systemic alterations in energy metabolism (e.g., increased insulin resistance and dysregulation of glucose metabolism). Emerging evidence that dietary restriction can forestall the development of AD is consistent with a major "metabolic" component to these disorders, and provides optimism that these devastating brain disorders of aging may be largely preventable.
