= Claudia dos Santos =

Canadian medical scientist

Claudia dos Santos is a Professor of Medicine in the Temerty Faculty of Medicine at the University of Toronto and a staff critical care intensivist at Unity Health Toronto (UHT). She is a Tier 1 Canada Research Chair in Translational Molecular Critical Care and a scientist at the Keenan Research Centre for Biomedical Science.

== Career ==
Dr. dos Santos completed her Undergraduate at Trent University, obtained her graduate degree from the Department of Molecular and Medical Genetics at the University of Toronto, working at the Hospital for Sick Children on Fanconi's Anemia with Dr. Manuel Buchwald. She obtained her Medical Doctor degree from the University of Toronto and worked during her post-doc with Drs. Mingyao Liu and Arthur Slutsky on the mechanotransduction response to cyclic stretch. She joined the University of Toronto (U of T) as Assistant Professor in 2006, Associate Professor in 2015 and was made Full Professor in 2023 in the Division of Respirology and Interdepartmental Division of Critical Care. Her clinical appointment is that of staff physician, Department of Critical Care Medicine (CCM), Saint Michael’s Hospital (SMH). She is a Fellow of the Royal College of Physicians of Surgeons and a Scientist at the Keenan Research Centre for Biomedical Science, appointed to the Institute of Medical Sciences, cross appointed to the Departments of Laboratory Medicine and Pathology, and Physiology. She is a member of the Collaborative Graduate Program in Genome Biology and Bioinformatics and the Canadian Critical Care Trials (CCCTG) and Translational Biology Groups (CCCTBG), leading clinical and translational science groups focused on advancing research and training in the field of Critical Care. She is a Parker B. Francis and Canadian Institutes of Health Research (CIHR) Fellow; a proud recipient of a CIHR New Investigator Award, Clinician-Scientist from the Heart and Stroke Foundation, and an Early Research Award from the Ministry of Research and Innovation of Ontario. Her laboratory is funded by the Canadian Institute of Health Research (CIHR), Natural Sciences and Engineering Research Council (NSERC), National Research Council of Canada (NRC), Canadian Foundation for Innovation (CFI), Ontario Research Fund (ORF), the Stem Cell Network (SCN), and the McLaughling and St. Michael’s Foundation.

dos Santos' research is focused on identifying novel therapeutic targets for the treatment of organ failure in patients with sepsis and acute respiratory distress syndrome (ARDS). Her lab has developed a variety of model systems ranging from basic cell-based assays to animal models of lung injury and sepsis.

By leveraging whole-genome techniques, including transcriptomics, and advanced computational strategies, the lab conducts functional genomics experiments to screen potential targets and evaluate their effectiveness in improving outcomes within preclinical models.

== Current projects ==
Dos Santos leads the Precision Medicine for Critical Care (PREDICT) program, which aims to use machine learning to improve translational molecular critical care. She also leads the ARIATNE (Advanced RNA-Intelligence for Accelerated Therapeutic Nanoparticle Engineering) alongside the Nanomedicine Innovation Network (NMIN), which is focused on using these techniques to prepare for pandemic response by developing personalized RNA therapies.

Additionally, Dr. dos Santos co-founded NorthMiRs, a student-owned startup dedicated to the development of RNA and gene-based nano therapies for treating sepsis and ARDS.
