= Metascape =

Gene annotation and analysis software

Metascape Bioinformatics Resources
- Original author: Metascape Team
- Developers: Yingyao Zhou, Bin Zhou, Lars Pache, Max Chang, Christopher Benner, Sumit Chanda
- Stable release: 3.5 / 1 March 2019; 7 years ago
- Type: Bioinformatics
- License: Freeware
- Website: metascape.org

Metascape is a free gene annotation and analysis resource that helps biologists make sense of one or multiple gene lists. Metascape provides automated meta-analysis tools to understand either common or unique pathways and protein networks within a group of orthogonal target-discovery studies.

== History ==
In the "OMICs" age, it is important to gain biological insights into a list of genes. Although a number of bioinformatics sources exist for this purpose, such as DAVID, they are not all free, easy to use, and well maintained. To analyze multiple lists of genes originated from orthogonal but complementary "OMICs" studies, tools often require computational skills that are beyond the reach of many biologists. According to the Metascape blog, a team of scientists self-organized to address this challenge. The team includes core members Yingyao Zhou, Bin Zhou, Lars Pache, Max Chang, Christopher Benner, and Sumit Chanda, as well as other contributors over the time. Metascape was first released as a beta version on Oct 8, 2015. The first Metascape application was published on Dec 9, 2015. Metascape has gone through multiple releases since then. It currently supports key model organisms, pathway enrichment analysis, protein-protein interaction network and component analysis, automatic presentation of the results as publication-ready web report, Excel and PowerPoint presentations.

The paper titled "Metascape provides a biologist-oriented resource for the analysis of systems-level datasets", published on Apr 3, 2019 in Nature Communications, has exceeded 10,000 citations by March 2026.

== Analysis workflow ==
Metascape implements a CAME analysis workflow:

- Conversion: Convert gene identifiers from popular types (such as Symbol, RefSeq, Ensembl, UniProt, UCSC) into human Entrez gene IDs and vice versa.
- Annotation: Extract from dozens of function-relevant gene annotations, including protein families, transmembrane/secreted predictions, disease associations, compound associations, etc.
- Membership: Flag gene memberships based on a custom keyword search within selected ontologies, e.g., highlight known "invasion" genes.
- Enrichment: Identify enriched biological themes, particularly GO terms, KEGG, Reactome, BioCarta, WikiPathways as well as other pathways and data sets collected in MSigDB, etc. In addition, enriched ontology terms are automatically clustered to reduce redundancy for easier interpretation. Protein-protein interaction networks are constructed based on STRING, BioGRID, OmniPath, etc. Dense components are identified and biologically interpreted.

Metascape integrated over 40 bioinformatics knowledgebase into a seamless user interface, where experimental biologists can use a single-click Express Analysis feature to turn multiple gene lists into interpretable results.

== Analysis report ==
All analysis results are presented in a web report, which contains Excel annotation and enrichment sheets, PowerPoint slides, and custom analysis files (e.g., .cys file by Cytoscape, .svg by Circos) for further offline analysis or processing.

One noticeable strength of Metascape is its visualization capability. Metascape has aided in the interpretation of 2,600 published studies as of December 2021, among which, 2/3 of publications made use of graphs or sheets prepared by Metascape.

== MSBio ==
Metascape for Bioinformaticians (MSBio) was released in 2021 to meet the growing needs of computational biologists to automate Metascape batch analyzes for large-scale gene lists. MSBio leverages the power of container technology to encapsulate the computational platform in Docker containers. Academic users can conduct offline analyses, which is only limited by the hardware they have access to. Commercial users have the capability of adding proprietary knowledgebase and conducting secure computations using internal computational assets. MSBio databases are updated in synchronization with the Metascape website.
