= Sumit Chanda =

American microbiologist

Sumit K. Chanda is an American research scientist who works on viral and immunological human diseases. He also led the team that built and deployed Metascape for the analysis of omics data. This tool has been cited over 7,600 times since its inception in 2019.

== Early life and education ==
Chanda earned his B.Sc. in biology at Cornell University and his Ph.D. in molecular pharmacology at Stanford University. He completed his postdoctoral training at the Genomics Institute of the Novartis Research Foundation, where he pioneered high-throughput approaches for target identification and validation that enabled preclinical development of novel therapeutics.

== Career ==
In 2014, Chanda, along with Bin Zhou, Yingyao Zhou, Max Chang, Lars Pache and Chris Benner created a free gene annotation and analysis resource called Metascape.

He returned to academic research at Sanford Burnham Prebys Medical Discovery Institute in 2007, where he became director of their Immunity and Pathogenesis program, and joined the Immunology and Microbiology Department at the Scripps Research Institute and Calibr as professor in 2021.

Chanda developed and applied large-scale systems-based approaches to identify host factors critical for viral replication, including influenza, SARS-CoV-2, flaviviruses and HIV-1. His team deployed high-throughput technologies for the discovery of antiviral therapies in response to the COVID-19 pandemic and discovered a novel class of latency reversal agents for an HIV-1 cure (3).

Chanda leads several large, multi-institutional collaborative efforts including the Center for Antiviral Medicines (CAMPP), which is a part of the NIAID Antiviral Drug Discovery (AViDD) network, as well as the Reversing Immune Dysfunction for HIV-1 Eradication Program (RID-HIV), which is a member of the National Institutes of Health's Martin Delaney Collaboratories for HIV Cure Research (MDC) program.

== Publications ==
- König, R; Zhou, Y; Elleder, D; Diamond, TL; Bonamy, GM; Irelan, JT; Chiang, CY; Tu, BP; De Jesus, PD; Lilley, CE; Seidel, S; Opaluch, AM; Caldwell, JS; Weitzman, MD; Kuhen, KL; Bandyopadhyay, S; Ideker, T; Orth, AP; Miraglia, LJ; Bushman, FD; Young, JA; Chanda, SK (2008). "Global analysis of host-pathogen interactions that regulate early-stage HIV-1 replication". Cell. 135: 49–60. doi:10.1016/j.cell.2008.07.032. PMC 2628946. PMID 18854154.
- König, R; Stertz, S; Zhou, Y; et al. (February 2010). "Human host factors required for influenza virus replication". Nature. 463: 813–7. doi:10.1038/nature08699. PMC 2862546. PMID 20027183.
- Yoh, SM; Schneider, M; Seifried, J; Soonthornvacharin, S; Akleh, RE; Olivieri, KC; De Jesus, PD; Ruan, C; de Castro, E; Ruiz, PA; Germanaud, D; Portes, V; García-Sastre, A; König, R; Chanda, SK (2015). "PQBP1 Is a Proximal Sensor of the cGAS-Dependent Innate Response to HIV-1". Cell. 161: 1293–1305. doi:10.1016/j.cell.2015.04.050. PMC 4503237. PMID 26046437.
- Zhou, Y; Zhou, B; Pache, L; Chang, M; Khodabakhshi, AH; Tanaseichuk, O; Benner, C; Chanda, SK (2019). "Metascape provides a biologist-oriented resource for the analysis of systems-level datasets". Nat Commun. 10 (1): 1523.
- Yuan, S; Yin, X; Meng, X; Chan, JF; Ye, ZW; Riva, L; Pache, L; Chan, CC; Lai, PM; Chan, CC; Poon, VK; Lee, AC; Matsunaga, N; Pu, Y; Yuen, CK; Cao, J; Liang, R; Tang, K; Sheng, L; Du, Y; Xu, W; Lau, CY; Sit, KY; Au, WK; Wang, R; Zhang, YY; Tang, YD; Clausen, TM; Pihl, J; Oh, J; Sze, KH; Zhang, AJ; Chu, H; Kok, KH; Wang, D; Cai, XH; Esko, JD; Hung, IF; Li, RA; Chen, H; Sun, H; Jin, DY; Sun, R; Chanda, SK; Yuen, KY (2021). "Clofazimine broadly inhibits coronaviruses including SARS-CoV-2". Nature. 593: 418–423. doi:10.1038/s41586-021-03431-4. PMC 7553155. PMID 33727703.
- Martin-Sancho, L; Lewinski, MK; Pache, L; Stoneham, CA; Yin, X; Becker, ME; Pratt, D; Churas, C; Rosenthal, SB; Liu, S; Weston, S; De Jesus, PD; O'Neill, AM; Gounder, AP; Nguyen, C; Pu, Y; Curry, HM; Oom, AL; Miorin, L; Rodriguez-Frandsen, A; Zheng, F; Wu, C; Xiong, Y; Urbanowski, M; Shaw, ML; Chang, MW; Benner, C; Hope, TJ; Frieman, MB; García-Sastre, A; Ideker, T; Hultquist, JF; Guatelli, J; Chanda, SK (2021). "Functional landscape of SARS-CoV-2 cellular restriction". Mol Cell. 81: 2656–2668.e8. doi:10.1016/j.molcel.2021.04.008. PMC 8043580. PMID 33930332.
- Yoh, SM; Mamede, JI; Lau, D; Ahn, N; Sánchez-Aparicio, MT; Temple, J; Tuckwell, A; Fuchs, NV; Cianci, GC; Riva, L; Curry, H; Yin, X; Gambut, S; Simons, LM; Hultquist, JF; König, R; Xiong, Y; García-Sastre, A; Böcking, T; Hope, TJ; Chanda, SK (2022). "Recognition of HIV-1 capsid by PQBP1 licenses an innate immune sensing of nascent HIV-1 DNA". Mol Cell. 82: 2871–2884.e6. doi:10.1016/j.molcel.2022.06.010. PMC 9552964. PMID 35809572.
