= GenMAPP =

Open-source bioinformatics software for genomics

- Screenshot of GenMAPP
- Developer(s): Alexander Pico, Kristina Hanspers, Nathan Salomonis, Kam Dahlquist, Scott Doniger, Jeff Lawlor, Alex Zambon, Lynn Ferrante, Karen Vranizan, Steven C. Lawlor, Bruce Conklin
- Operating system: Windows
- Type: Bioinformatics
- License: Apache License
- Website: www.genmapp.org

GenMAPP (Gene Map Annotator and Pathway Profiler) is a free, open-source bioinformatics software tool designed to visualize and analyze genomic data in the context of pathways (metabolic, signaling), connecting gene-level datasets to biological processes and disease. First created in 2000, GenMAPP is developed by an open-source team based in an academic research laboratory. GenMAPP maintains databases of gene identifiers and collections of pathway maps in addition to visualization and analysis tools. Together with other public resources, GenMAPP aims to provide the research community with tools to gain insight into biology through the integration of data types ranging from genes to proteins to pathways to disease.

== History ==
GenMAPP was first created in 2000 as a prototype software tool in the laboratory of Bruce Conklin at the J. David Gladstone Institutes in San Francisco and continues to be developed in the same non-profit, academic research environment. The first release version of GenMAPP 1.0 was available in 2002, supporting analysis of DNA microarray data from human, mouse, rat and yeast. In 2004, GenMAPP 2.0 was released, combining the previously accessory programs MAPPFinder and MAPPBuilder, and expanding support to additional species. GenMAPP 2.1 was released in 2006 with new visualization features and support for a total of eleven species.

== Usage ==
GenMAPP was developed by biologists and is focused on pathway visualization for bench biologists. Unlike many other computational systems biology tools, GenMAPP is not designed for cell/systems modeling; it focuses on the immediate needs of bench biologists by enabling them to rapidly interpret genomic data with an intuitive, easy-to-use interface. GenMAPP is implemented in Visual Basic 6.0 and is available as a stand-alone application for Microsoft Windows operating systems, including Boot Camp or Parallels Workstation on a Mac.

== Content and Features ==
GenMAPP builds and maintains gene databases for a variety of key model organisms:

- human - Homo sapiens
- mouse - Mus musculus
- rat - Rattus norvegicus
- yeast - Saccharomyces cerevisiae
- zebrafish - Danio rerio
- worm - Caenorhabditis elegans
- fruit fly - Drosophila melanogaster
- dog - Canis familiaris
- cow - Bos taurus
- mosquito - Anopheles gambiae
- E.coli - Escherichia coli

GenMAPP provides tools to create, edit and annotate biological pathway maps.

GenMAPP allows users to visualize and analyze their data in the context of pathway collections and the Gene Ontology.

== See also ==
- WikiPathways
- Cytoscape
- Ensembl
- KEGG
- Netpath
- Reactome
- Gene Ontology
