= Functional drug sensitivity testing =

Test to guide treatment for cancer

Functional drug sensitivity testing (f-DST) is an in-vitro diagnostic test method in functional precision medicine. It was developed to personalize the choice among cytotoxic drugs and drug combinations for patients with an indication for systemic chemotherapy in specific cancer types. f-DST is performed by various in-vitro diagnostic methods which have in common to quantify reactions of individual patient-derived cancer tissue when exposed to cytotoxic drugs. As substrate, testing methods initially require live cancer tissue from an individual patient (metastases or primary tumor).

== Background and rationale ==
Since the 1970s, randomized controlled trials have been used to assess new cancer therapies. Randomized trials assess average effects of treatment across a patient population, but cytotoxic chemotherapies are known to have different effects and side effect profiles for different individuals. Precision medicine aims to match patients with the best available treatment for their tumor.

== Methodology and laboratory procedures ==
f-DST methodology comprises three basic steps: Pre-analytical processing of cancerous tissue samples, cultivation of the testable cellular product (i.e. tumoroids, organoids, cell clusters, single cells) and subsequent exposition to the clinically most important cytotoxic agents (5-FU, oxaliplatin, irinotecan, individually or in combinations (CAPOX, FOLFOX, FOLFIRI, FOLFOXIRI), as well as to other cytotoxic substances.

Biopsy samples containing live cancer tissue are processed to obtain the required type, histologic organization and number of carcinomatous cells. This could be isolated cells, cell clusters, organoids or tumoroids of defined sizes. The processed cancer specimen, cell or organized cell aggregates, are then cultured in stem cell media to increase in number and expand into a sufficient number of testable cancer cell aggregates as required, depending on the used test model.

Tumor cells can be grown in different environments including 3-dimensional organoids, on chips that simulate the tumor microenvironment, or xenografted on to animal models. After defined time periods of culture, often between 3 and 7 days, cell or organized cell aggregates are counted and transferred to drug screening arrays, where they are exposed to defined concentrations of the cytotoxic drugs or drug combinations in question.

Measurement methods and statistical analyses usually focus on cell/cell aggregate behaviour in vitro under exposure to the test drugs after defined periods of time. In vitro reactions of those patient-derived cancer cell or cell aggregates following exposure to standardized cytotoxic drug concentrations over a specified time are then calculated based on positive and negative controls and/or to calibration curves obtained from reference populations.

== Clinical application ==
f-DST provides information on an individual patient's tumoroids / organoids / cell cluster / cell vulnerabilities towards cytotoxic chemotherapies in vitro

== Limitations and future directions ==
f-DST requires repeat, fresh cancerous tissue biopsy procedures, which is not standard of care in the routine diagnostic workup of solid tumor patients in all stages of the disease.

If organoids or tumoroids are cultured for the purpose of fDST, results start being available from between 14 and 21 days after the bioptic procedure.

Like other functional testing methods (e.g. antibiograms), none of the current f-DST methods claims to fully replicate the intricate interactions of tumor tissue within a patient's body. However, information obtained by f-DST is being clinically investigated regarding relevant endpoints such as progression free survival.

f-DST is an emerging in vitro diagnostic tool. It has the potential to shift the current average cytotoxic drug efficacy / side effects risk balance of classic systemic chemotherapies for which no individual biomarkers exist.
