= DAVID =

DAVID Bioinformatics Resources
- Stable release: 2021.2024q1 / January 2024; 1 year ago
- Type: Bioinformatics
- License: Freeware
- Website: david.ncifcrf.gov

DAVID (the database for annotation, visualization and integrated discovery) is a free online bioinformatics resource developed by the Laboratory of Human Retrovirology and Immunoinformatics (LHRI). All tools in the DAVID Bioinformatics Resources aim to provide functional interpretation of large lists of genes derived from genomic studies, e.g. microarray and proteomics studies. DAVID can be found at https://david.ncifcrf.gov/

The DAVID Bioinformatics Resources consists of the DAVID Knowledgebase and five integrated, web-based functional annotation tool suites: the DAVID Gene Functional Classification Tool, the DAVID Functional Annotation Tool, the DAVID Gene ID Conversion Tool, the DAVID Gene Name Viewer and the DAVID NIAID Pathogen Genome Browser. The expanded DAVID Knowledgebase now integrates almost all major and well-known public bioinformatics resources centralized by the DAVID Gene Concept, a single-linkage method to agglomerate tens of millions of diverse gene/protein identifiers and annotation terms from a variety of public bioinformatics databases. For any uploaded gene list, the DAVID Resources now provides not only the typical gene-term enrichment analysis, but also new tools and functions that allow users to condense large gene lists into gene functional groups, convert between gene/protein identifiers, visualize many-genes-to-many-terms relationships, cluster redundant and heterogeneous terms into groups, search for interesting and related genes or terms, dynamically view genes from their lists on bio-pathways and more.

DAVID 2021 update was released in December 2021. The knowledgebase has been scheduled to update quarterly.

== Functionality ==
DAVID provides a comprehensive set of functional annotation tools for investigators to understand biological meaning behind large list of genes. For any given gene list, DAVID tools are able to:

- Identify enriched biological themes, particularly GO terms
- Discover enriched functional-related gene groups
- Cluster redundant annotation terms
- Visualize genes on BioCarta & KEGG pathway maps
- Display related many-genes-to-many-terms on 2-D view.
- Search for other functionally related genes not in the list
- List interacting proteins
- Explore gene names in batch
- Link gene-disease associations
- Highlight protein functional domains and motifs
- Redirect to related literatures
- Convert gene identifiers from one type to another.
