= Embryology =

Branch of biology studying prenatal development

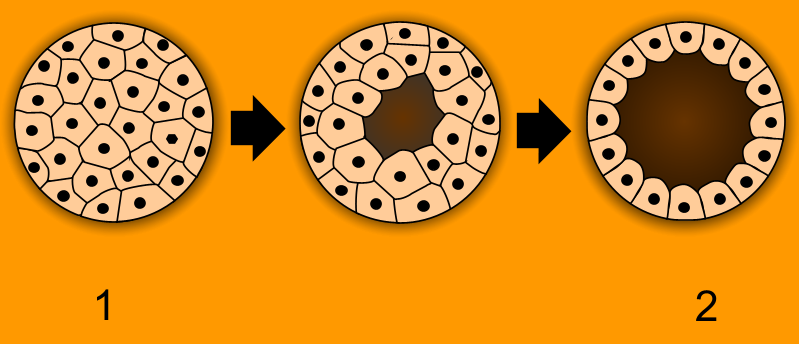
1 - morula, 2 - blastula

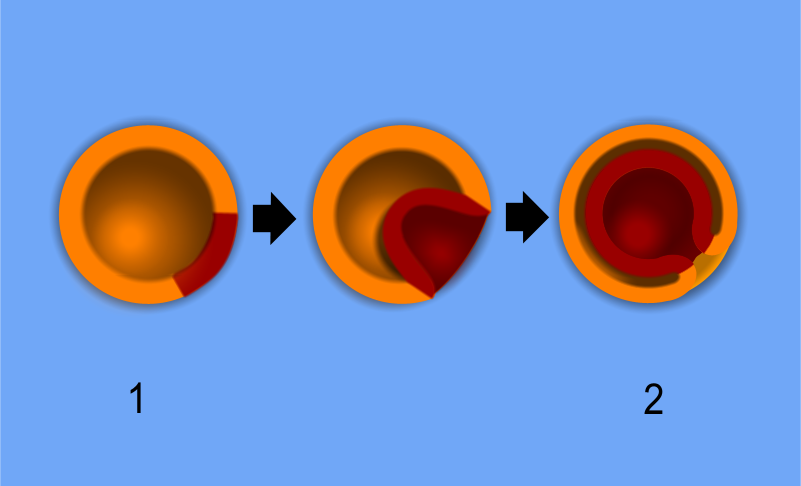
1 - blastula, 2 - gastrula with blastopore; orange - ectoderm, red - endoderm

Embryology (from Greek ἔμβρυον, embryon, 'the unborn, embryo'; and -λογία, -logia) is the branch of zoology that studies the prenatal development of gametes (sex cells), fertilization and development of embryos and fetuses. It is a subset of, and predecessor to, developmental biology. Embryology includes teratology, the study of congenital disorders that occur before birth.

Early embryology, put forward by Marcello Malpighi, was preformationist in concept: based on the idea that organisms develop from pre-existing miniature versions of themselves. The theory now accepted, epigenesis, is the idea that organisms develop from seed or egg in a sequence of steps. This concept was proposed in antiquity by Aristotle. Modern embryology developed from the work of Karl Ernst von Baer, though accurate observations had been made in Italy by anatomists such as Ulisse Aldrovandi and Leonardo da Vinci in the Renaissance.

== Branches and subdisciplines ==
=== Comparative embryology ===
==== Preformationism and epigenesis ====
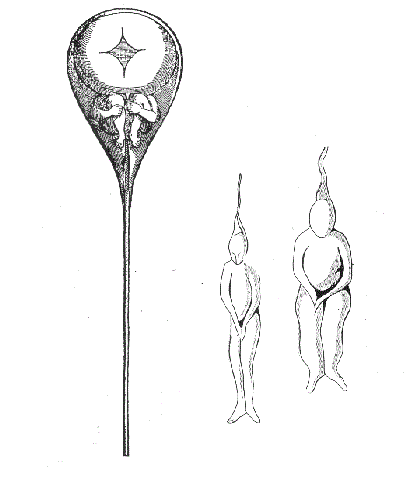
A tiny person (a homunculus) inside a sperm, as drawn by Nicolaas Hartsoeker in 1695

As recently as the 18th century, the prevailing notion in Western human embryology was preformation: the idea that a sperm cell itself contains an embryo—a preformed, miniature infant, or homunculus—which simply becomes larger as it develops. The competing explanation of embryonic development was epigenesis, originally proposed 2,000 years earlier by Aristotle. According to epigenesis, the form of an animal emerges gradually from a relatively formless egg.

Much early embryology came from the work of the Italian anatomists Aldrovandi, Aranzio, Leonardo da Vinci, Marcello Malpighi, Gabriele Falloppio, Girolamo Cardano, Emilio Parisano, Fortunio Liceti, Stefano Lorenzini, Spallanzani, Enrico Sertoli, and Mauro Ruscóni. As microscopy improved during the 19th century, biologists could see that embryos took shape in a series of progressive steps, and epigenesis displaced preformation as the favored explanation among embryologists.

==== Bilaterians ====
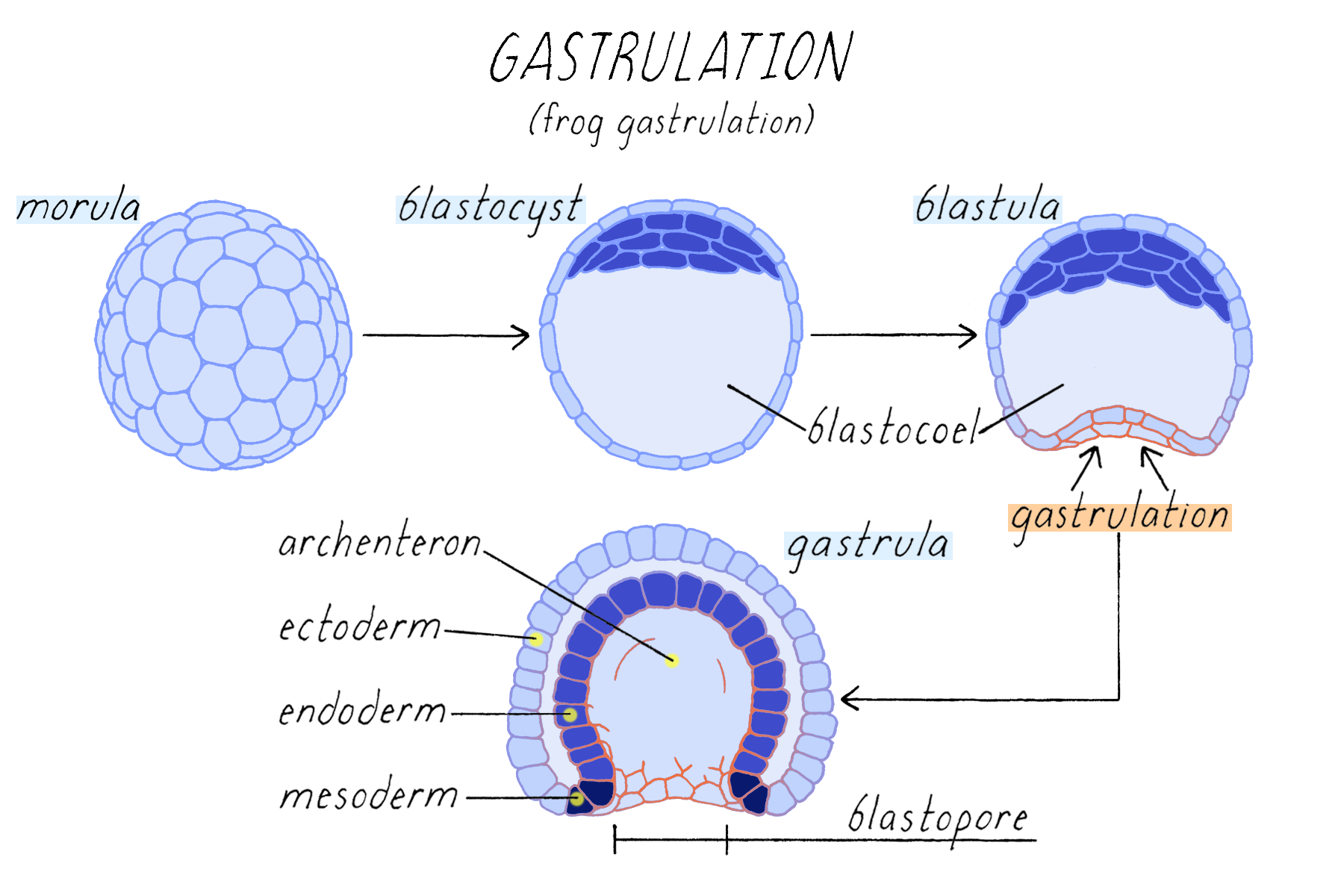
The early developmental process that transforms an embryo from a two dimensional (flat) layer of cells (the blastula) into a 3D, multilayered, embryo known as the gastrula.

In the bilateral animals cleavage can be either holoblastic or meroblastic. The subsequent gastrulation occurs in one of two ways, diving the whole animal kingdom into two major groups (see: Embryological origins of the mouth and anus). In protostomes the first pore of the blastula (the blastopore) becomes the mouth of the animal; in deuterostomes the mouth derives from a later pore and the blastopore becomes the anus. The protostomes include most invertebrate animals, such as insects, worms and molluscs, while the deuterostomes include a few invertebrates such as the echinoderms (starfish and relatives) and all the vertebrates.

===== Drosophila melanogaster (fruit fly) =====
Drosophila have been used as a developmental model for many years. These studies have discovered many useful aspects of development that apply to other species. Outlined below is the process that leads to cell and tissue differentiation.

1. Maternal-effect genes help to define the anterior-posterior axis using the bicoid and nanos genes.
2. Gap genes establish three 'broad segments' of the embryo.
3. Pair-rule genes define seven segments of the embryo within the second of those 'broad' segments.
4. Segment-polarity genes divide each of those pre-existing seven segments into anterior and posterior halves (thus defining another seven segments), using a gradient of Hedgehog and Wnt signal proteins.
5. Homeotic (Hox) genes use the 14 segments as pinpoints for specific types of cell differentiation and the histological developments that correspond to each cell type.

===== Humans =====
Humans are bilateral animals that have holoblastic rotational cleavage. Humans are also deuterostomes. In regard to humans, the term embryo refers to the ball of dividing cells from the moment the zygote implants itself in the uterus wall until the end of the eighth week after conception. Beyond the eighth week after conception (tenth week of pregnancy), the developing human is then called a fetus.

=== Evolutionary embryology ===
Evolutionary embryology is the expansion of comparative embryology by the ideas of Charles Darwin. Similarly to Karl Ernst von Baer's principles that explained why many species often appear similar to one another in early developmental stages, Darwin argued that the relationship between groups can be determined based upon common embryonic and larval structures.

Von Baer established the following principles:

1. The general features appear earlier in development than do the specialized features.
2. More specialized characters develop from the more general ones.
3. The embryo of a given species never resembles the adult form of a lower one.
4. The embryo of a given species does resemble the embryonic form of a lower one.

Using Darwin's theory, evolutionary embryologists have since been able to distinguish between homologous and analogous structures appearing in different species. Homologous structures are those whose similarities derive from a common ancestor, such as the human arm and bat wings. Analogous structures are those that seem similar despite lacking common ancestral derivation.

Embryology is central to evolutionary developmental biology ("evo-devo"), which studies the genetic control of the development process (e.g. morphogens), its link to cell signalling, its roles in certain diseases and mutations, and its links to stem cell research. Embryology is the key to gestational surrogacy, which is when the sperm of the intended father and egg of intended mother are fused in a lab forming an embryo. This embryo is then put into the surrogate who carries the child to term.

=== Preventative medical embryology ===
Medical embryology is used widely as preventative medicine to detect abnormalities before birth. 2–5% of babies are born with an observable abnormality, and medical embryology explores the different ways and stages that these abnormalities appear. Genetically derived abnormalities are referred to as malformations. When there are multiple malformations, this is considered a syndrome. The syndromes are able to present in many different ways throughout the body. They can be vascular, musculoskeletal, chromosomal, etc. When abnormalities appear due to outside contributors, these are disruptions. The outside contributors causing disruptions are known as teratogens. Common teratogens are alcohol, retinoic acid, ionizing radiation or hyperthermic stress.

=== Vertebrate and invertebrate embryology ===
Many principles of embryology apply to invertebrates as well as to vertebrates. Therefore, the study of invertebrate embryology has advanced the study of vertebrate embryology. However, there are many differences as well. For example, numerous invertebrate species release a larva before development is complete; at the end of the larval period, an animal for the first time comes to resemble an adult similar to its parent or parents. Although invertebrate embryology is similar in some ways for different invertebrate animals, there are also numerous variations. For instance, while spiders proceed directly from egg to adult form, many insects develop through at least one larval stage. For decades, a number of so-called normal staging tables were produced for the embryology of particular species, mainly focusing on external developmental characters. As variation in developmental progress makes comparison among species difficult, a character-based Standard Event System was developed, which documents these differences and allows for phylogenetic comparisons among species.

== Research methods ==
Initially, all embryology research was done through observing embryos. The quality of the observations was increased using microscopy and staining techniques. Starting in the late 1800s, scientists developed microsurgical techniques to manipulate embryos, such as nuclear transfer. Later advances in biology allowed higher-fidelity modification and creation of embryos.

=== Model organisms ===
Several model organisms are commonly used in embryological research, including the fruit fly (Drosophila melanogaster), the roundworm (Caenorhabditis elegans), the zebrafish (Danio rerio), the clawed frog (Xenopus laevis/Xenopus tropicalis), the chicken (Gallus gallus), and the mouse (Mus musculus). Various organisms have different strengths; for example, bird and frog embryos are easier to transplant and manipulate experimentally, while zebrafish and mouse are easier to manipulate genetically. Preferred organisms have changed over time; for example, Xenopus embryos have displaced salamanders and newts as primary objects of study.

=== Observational techniques ===
The first scientific embryology was done through direct observation, specifically through the dissection of eggs and embryos. Histology, specifically fixing, sectioning, and staining tissue, was the basis of descriptive embryology through the 19th and early 20th centuries. This was first done using instruments such as razors to turn embryos into slices, which could then be reconstructed in three dimensions. The specimens can be preserved (via hardening or casting), dyed using various chemicals, or fixed on slides or within other material.

=== Experimental manipulation ===
Experimental embryology grew out of cutting, grafting, and isolating embryonic parts. Transplantation – the process of moving embryonic tissue, or whole embryos, from one location to another – was used early on by embryologists, and is still in use today. Other common experimental techniques include the destruction or substitution of part of an embryo with a different part, or the isolation of an embryo piece to observe the piece's development.

=== Molecular and genetic tools ===
In situ hybridization and immunohistochemistry reveal where genes are expressed and where proteins accumulate in embryos. Single-cell RNA sequencing now allows whole embryos to be profiled cell by cell, meaning researchers can observe changes in transcriptions as the embryo develops. Modern microscopy methods, data analysis, and integration of fluorescent molecules has allowed high-detail observation of gene function.

To determine the function of a gene during development, researchers may insert new DNA into a cell via microinjection, transfection, or electroporation, among other methods. They can also cause gene knockouts by replacing wild type genes with mutants, or use antisense RNA to block the messenger for a gene. Cloning (notably including nuclear transfer) of amphibians and mammals has been used by some embryologists to study the relationship between the nucleus and cytoplasm during fertilization.

== History ==
=== Ancient Egypt ===
Knowledge of the placenta dates at least to ancient Egypt, where it was viewed as the seat of the soul. There was an Egyptian official with the title Opener of the Kings Placenta. An Egyptian text from the time of Akhenaten said that a human originates from the egg that grows in women.

=== Ancient Asia ===
Various interpretations of embryology have existed in Asia throughout history. Included in the ancient Indian tradition of Ayurveda is garbhasharir or the study of embryology, which refers to conceptions of embryology from antiquity. Descriptions of the amniotic sac appear in the Bhagavad Gita, Bhagavata Purana, and the Sushruta Samhita. One of the Upanishads known as the Garbhopanisaḍ states that the embryo is "like water in the first night, in seven nights it is like a bubble, at the end of half a month it becomes a ball. At the end of a month it is hardened, in two months the head is formed". In Indian literature, the start of consciousness in an embryo is not clearly defined. Some scriptures state that it is active at conception, while others suggest that consciousness begins in the seventh to ninth month of fetal development. Many South Asian traditions, including some Tibetan traditions, believe that the fetus has conscious experiences towards the end of its development.

The development of the human embryo is mentioned in the ancient Buddhist text of Garbhāvakrāntisūtra (1st–4th century CE). It mentions the human gestation period of 38 days. The text describes embryonic development in first three weeks as a liquid part of yogurt and the differentiation of body parts such as arms, leg, feet and head in the third month.

=== Ancient Greece ===
==== Pre-Socratic philosophers ====
Many pre-Socratic philosophers are recorded as having opinions on different aspects of embryology, although there is some bias in the description of their views in later authors such as Aristotle. According to Empedocles (whose views are described by Plutarch in the 1st century AD), who lived in the 5th century BC, the embryo derives and receives its blood from four vessels in all; two arteries and two veins. He also held sinews as originating from equal mixtures of earth and air. He further said men begin to form within the first month and are finished within fifty days. Asclepiades agreed that men are formed within fifty days, but he believed that women took a full two months to be fully knit. One observation, variously attributed to either Anaxagoras of Clazomenae or Alcmaeon of Croton, says that the milk produced by mammals is analogous to the white of fowl egg.

Diogenes of Apollonia said that a mass of flesh forms first, only then followed by the development of bone and nerves. Diogenes recognized that the placenta was a nutritional source for the growing fetus. He also said that the development of males took four months, but that the development of females took five months. He did not think the embryo was alive. Alcmaeon also made some contributions, and is the first person reported to have practiced dissection. One idea, first stated by Parmenides, was that there was a connection between the right side of the body and the male embryo, and between the left side of the body and the female embryo. According to Democritus and Epicurus, the fetus is nourished at the mouth inside the mother and there are comparable teats that supply this nourishment within the mother's body to the fetus. Discussion on various views regarding how long it takes for specific parts of the embryo to form appear in an anonymous document known as the Nutriment.

Ancient Greeks discussed whether only the male had a seed which developed into the embryo within the female womb, or both the male and the female each had a seed that made a contribution to the developing embryo. The difficulty that one-seed theorists confronted was to explain the maternal resemblance of the progeny. One issue that two-seed theorists confronted was why the female seed was needed if the male already had a seed. One common solution to this problem was to assert that the female seed was either inferior or inactive.

Another question was the origin of the seed. The encephalomyelogenic theory stated that the seed originated from the brain or and/or bone marrow. Later came pangenesis, which asserted the seed was drawn from the whole body in order to explain the general resemblance in the body of the offspring. Later on, hematogenous theory developed, which asserted that the seed was drawn from the blood.

A third question was how or in what form the progeny existed in the seed prior to developing into an embryo and a fetus. According to preformationists, the body of the progeny already existed in a pre-existing but undeveloped form in the seed. Three variants of preformationism were homoiomerous preformationism, anhomoiomerous preformationism, and homuncular preformationism. According to the first, the homoiomerous parts of the body (e.g. humors, bone) already exist pre-formed in the seed. The second held that it was the anhomoiomerous parts that were pre-formed. Finally, the third view held that the whole was already a unified organic thing. Preformationism was not the only view. According to epigenesists, parts of the embryo successively form after conception takes place.

==== Hippocrates ====
Some of the most well-known early ideas on embryology come from Hippocrates and the Hippocratic Corpus, where discussion on the embryo is usually given in the context of discussing obstetrics (pregnancy and childbirth). Some of the most relevant Hippocratic texts on embryology include the Regimen on Acute Diseases, On Semen, and On the Development of the Child. Hippocrates claimed that the development of the embryo is put into motion by fire and that nourishment comes from food and breath introduced into the mother. An outer layer of the embryo solidifies, and the fire within consumes humidity which makes way for development of bone and nerve. The fire in the innermost part becomes the belly and air channels are developed in order to route nourishment to it. The enclosed fire also helps form veins and allows for circulation. In this description, Hippocrates aimed at describing the causes of development rather than describing what develops. Hippocrates also developed views similar to preformationism, where he claimed that all parts of the embryo simultaneously develop.

Hippocrates also believed that maternal blood nourishes the embryo. This blood flows and coagulates to help form the flesh of the fetus. This idea was derived from the observation that menstrual blood ceases during pregnancy, which Hippocrates took to imply that it was being redirected to fetal development. Hippocrates also claimed that the flesh differentiates into different organs of the body, and Hippocrates saw as analogous an experiment where a mixture of substances placed into water will differentiate into different layers. Comparing the seed to the embryo, Hippocrates further compared the stalk to the umbilical cord.

==== Plato and Aristotle ====
Some embryological discussion appears in Plato's writings, especially in his Timaeus. One of his views were that the bone marrow acted as the seedbed, and that the soul itself was the seed out of which the embryo developed, though he did not explain how this development proceeded.

Aristotle discusses embryology in much more detail, especially in his On the Generation of Animals, with further detail in his History of Animals, On the Parts of Animals, On Respiration, and On the Motion of Animals. Aristotle studied embryology by examining developing embryos from animals, as well as aborted and miscarried human embryos. Aristotle believed that the female supplied menstrual blood for the development of the embryo, whereas the male's semen shaped that matter.

Aristotle's belief that both the male and female made a contribution to the actual fetus goes against some prior beliefs. According to Aeschylus and some Egyptian traditions, the fetus solely develops from the male contribution and that the female womb simply nourishes this growing fetus. On the other hand, the Melanesians held that the fetus is solely a product of the female contribution.

Aristotle did not believe there were any external influences on the development of the embryo. Against Hippocrates, Aristotle believed that new parts of the body developed over time rather than all forming immediately and developing from then on. He also considered whether each new part derives from a previously formed part or develops independently of any previously formed part. On the basis that different parts of the body do not resemble each other, he decided in favor of the latter view.

He also described development of fetal parts in terms of mechanical and automatic processes. In terms of the development of the embryo, he says it begins in a liquid-like state as the material secreted by the female combines with the semen of the male, and then the surface begins to solidify as it interacts with processes of heating and cooling. The first part of the body to differentiate is the heart, which Aristotle and many of his contemporaries believed was the location of reason and thinking. Aristotle claimed that vessels join to the uterus in order to supply nourishment to the developing fetus. Some of the most solid parts of the fetus cool and, as they lose moisture to heat, turn into nails, horns, hoofs, beaks, etc. Internal heat dries away moisture and forms sinews and bones and the skin results from drying of the flesh.

Aristotle also describes the development of birds in eggs at length. He further described embryonic development in dolphins, some sharks, and many other animals. Aristotle singularly wrote more on embryology than any other pre-modern author, and his influence on the subsequent discussion on the subject for many centuries was immense, introducing into the subject forms of classification, a comparative method from various animals, discussion of the development of sexual characteristics, compared the development of the embryo to mechanistic processes, and so forth. Aristotle's views on embryogenesis were accepted for over one and a half millenia.

In his work Categories, Aristotle discussed the idea of a perfect specimen and how both man and animals had the capacity to develop to this image of perfection. He used the methods of reproduction to expand on this idea, claiming that a progeny's soul or essence came from the semen of the male and the physical body itself was developed inside the female.

Later physical science considered the idea that both male and female contributed physical material to their offspring. This idea was fostered by Galen in the 3rd century, however, he maintained that Aristotle was correct in his claim that the incitation of life was provided by the male, particularly in the form of semen. Alongside this, Galen discussed the male seed as being fundamental to development of the progeny because of the imperfections of the female seed.

In the 11th century, the philosopher Avicenna attempted to find an agreement between Aristotelian and Galenic theories. He suggested that the female seed Galen discussed was the same as menstrual blood from Aristotle's considerations of the development of the progeny's body. Despite this synthesis of the two, Galen's argument remained the most appropriate to be applied to medical reasoning.

==== Later Greek embryology ====
Reportedly, some Stoics claimed that most parts of the body formed at once during embryological development. Some Epicureans claimed that the fetus is nourished by either the amniotic fluid or the blood, and that both male and female supply material to the development of the fetus. According to the writings of Tertullian, Herophilus in the 5th century BC described the ovaries and fallopian tubes (but not past what was already described by Aristotle) and also dissected some embryos. Though not a part of Greek tradition, in Job 10, the formation of the embryo is likened to the curdling of milk into cheese, as described by Aristotle. Whereas Needham sees this statement in Job as part of the Aristotelian tradition, others see it as evidence that the milk analogy predates the Aristotelian Greek tradition and originates in Jewish circles. In addition, the Wisdom of Solomon (7:2) also has the embryo formed from menstrual blood. Soranus of Ephesus also wrote texts on embryology which went into use for a long time.

Some rabbinic texts discuss the embryology of a female Greek writer named Cleopatra, a contemporary of Galen and Soranus, who was said to have claimed that the male fetus is complete in 41 days whereas the female fetus is complete in 81 days. Various other texts of less importance also appear and describe various aspects of embryology, though without making much progress from Aristotle. Plutarch has a chapter in one of his works titled "Whether was before, the hen or egg?" Discussion on embryological tradition also appears in many Neoplatonic traditions.

Next to Aristotle, the most impactful and important Greek writer on biology was Galen of Pergamum, and his works were transmitted throughout the Middle Ages. Galen discusses his understanding of embryology in two of his texts, those being his On the Natural Faculties and his On the Formation of the Foetus. There is an additional text spuriously attributed to Galen known as On the Question of whether the Embryo is an Animal. Galen described embryological development in four stages. In the first stage, the semen predominates. In the second stage, the embryo is filled with blood. In the third stage, the main outlines of the organs have developed but various other parts remain undeveloped. In the fourth stage, formation is complete and has reached a stage where we can call it a child.

Galen described processes that played a role in furthering development of the embryo such as warming, drying, cooling, and combinations thereof. As this development plays out, the form of life of the embryo also moves from that like a plant to that of an animal (where the analogy between the root and umbilical cord is made). Galen claimed that the embryo forms from menstrual blood, by which his experimental analogy was that when you cut the vein of an animal and allow blood to flow out and into some mildly heated water, a sort of coagulation can be observed. He gave detailed descriptions of the position of the umbilical cord relative to other veins.

=== Late Middle Ages embryology ===
In the 16th and 17th centuries as agriculture and animal breeding became focuses of both nobles and working-class, scholars began to question Aristotelian theories in favor of empirical theories. One such scholar at the front of this advance was Francis Bacon, who explored the processes and experimentation of breeding in his unfinished work New Atlantis. The goal of Bacon's research was to perfect existing species and animals. His records show that he believed with the proper care and attention given to the process of procreation between animals, he could determine which traits of the parents the progeny would have and to what extent those traits would be developed. For example, in sizes of animals, Bacon explored giantism and dwarfism.

Another important scholar of the time was William Harvey, whose use of microscopes in his research led to modern scientists and philosophers asking the question of when a progeny could be considered "created." The two main schools of thought are those of the preformationists and epigenesists, who believe in creation beginning once the egg of an animal is laid and creation occurring at the time of intercourse respectively.

French surgeon Ambroise Paré was part of the latter group and his theories on birth defects was influenced by it. In particular, Paré claimed that too much male seed during the act of intercourse could result in a deformity in the progeny. However, the common understanding of birth defects among animal breeders during the time of the Renaissance was most informed by the work of Andreas Vesalius. Deformities in animal breeding were usually mysteries of little importance by the breeders themselves, though the answer of how and why these irregular births happened was supposedly discoverable by dissection of the parents. Though most would not take upon them this task and the mysteries contained by embryos would remain unsolved, considered all at once natural, heavenly, and demonic.

=== Modern embryology ===
==== Early modern embryology ====
According to Joseph Needham, scientific embryology was revived in the 1200s by Albert of Cologne. Albert believed women produced seeds which coagulated when in contact with male seeds; the coagulated mass then made contact with menstrual blood to receive nutrition necessary for development. Leonardo da Vinci also conducted dissections of human fetuses to quantitatively measure their changes in weight and size over time, the first person to do so.

The first empirical analysis of embryological development was done in the late 1500s by Ulisse Aldrovandi and his student Volcher Coiter, who made daily observations of chick embyros. The first pictures of embryo development were published in 1625 in De formatione ovi et pulli by Hieronymus Fabricius ab Aquapendente; he is sometimes considered the author of the first illustrated descriptive text on embryology. Marcello Malpighi made more detailed investigations using microscopy.

===== Preformationism and epigenesis =====
Needham credits Malpighi with reviving preformationism, tentatively believing in 1673 that the egg and embryo contained a form of the organism from conception too small to see. However, Malpighi did not make claims about the origin of embryonic organs. Francesco Redi had found in 1668 that "lower forms of life" such as insects required eggs for reproduction, refuting spontaneous generation. Preformationism was also advocated by Antonie van Leeuwenhoek, who first saw spermatozoa in semen under a microscope in 1677; he believed a miniature homunculus existed in each sperm cell. Various forms of preformationism were suggested, such as emboîtement, which says that the miniature form has existed since the development of the parent. This was first put forth by Malebranche in 1674.

After the discovery of spermatozoa, the preformationist school split into the ovists (who believed the embryo was preformed in the egg and the spermatozoa were parasites) and the animalculists (who believed it was in the sperm and the egg only provided nutrition). The ovists were declared victorious after the 1745 discovery of parthenogenesis in aphids by Charles Bonnet, showing development can occur without sperm.

William Harvey was the first to conceptualize a unified pattern of development across species. He also corrected various errors of Aristotle, such as his idea that the male provided the form of the embryo while the female only provided the substance. "Epigenesis" was coined by Harvey in 1651 in Exercitationes de Generatione Animalium, building on Aristotle's theories. Harvey thought that there must be a "divine Agent" initiating development; (Note: Mirroring the "entelechy" proposed by Aristotle) this was rejected by mechanistic thinkers such as René Descartes. Harvey also opposed what is now called "pangenesis", where embryos are assembled from preexisting heterogenous material.

The modern form of epigenesis was formulated by Caspar Friedrich Wolff in his 1759 treatise Theoria generationis. Wolff held that the form of an embryo was gradually shaped out of undifferentiated matter; to explain how this could occur, he suggested all organic processes, including ontogeny, were caused by a combination of flowing and non-flowing nutritive fluids, guided by a "vis essentialis". Wolff came in conflict with Albrecht von Haller, who supported preformationism.

Georges Buffon instead proposed the corpuscular theory of generation in 1804. Buffon claimed the body of the parent acts as an internal mold for the body parts of the child, developed through the process of nutrition.

The development of the cell theory of biology by various figures between 1820 and 1880 disconfirmed the preformationist theory of development, as during the growth of an embryo new cells are created, rather than old structures growing. The incorporation of cell theory has been called "the most important step taken in embryology". By the end of the 19th century, preformation had given way to forms of predeterminism, which held that the form of the organism was fully set from the start of development, even if the structure (i.e. homunculus) didn't physically exist.

===== Germ layer theory =====
Christian Heinrich Pander and Karl Ernst von Baer proposed the theory of germ layers, a fundamental aspect of embryology. The theory proposes development as differentiation of primary membranes (layers) at early stages of development, which then transform through folding into anatomical structures. Von Baer initially thought there were only two layers; Pander and His later found there were usually three. Pander identified that the originally homogeneous egg differentiates into two membranes after 12 hours, which he termed the "serous layer" and the "mucous layer", with a "vascular layer" forming between them after another 10 to 14 hours.

Pander first described membrane folding in 1817; von Baer began his own investigations in response, published several years later. Von Baer held a more nuanced view of "membranes as flexible surfaces". He discovered the notochord as a distinct structure and identified the neural folds which developed into the spinal cord; he also found the mammalian egg (first in dogs), ending a search which began in the 1600s. In the early 1850s, Robert Remak combined cell theory and germ layer theory, proposing that the layers came about from divisions of cells producing cell lineages.

In the nineteenth century, techniques such as chemical staining improved capabilities for comparative embryology. In this time period, Martin Rathke made a number of experimental discoveries, including the brachial clefts and gill arches in amniotes and various relationships in the vertebrate urogenital system. Through his work, he demonstrated the existence of germ layers in vertebrates and invertebrates.

===== Recapitulation theory and von Baer's laws =====
Embryology theories of Ernst Haeckel and Karl Ernst von Baer compared

Recapitulation theory was developed by various scientists starting in the 1790s, including Johann Friedrich Meckel, Carl Friedrich Kielmeyer, Étienne Serres, and Ernst Haeckel. Recapitulation suggests that during development, the embryo takes on the appearance of the adult stages of its successive ancestors. Charles Darwin and Ernst Haeckel considered recapitulation as strong evidence of evolution; Haeckel later summarized his view as the "biogenetic law" in 1875: "ontogeny recapitulates phylogeny". His views made him a polarizing figure; Haeckel's law is now generally disregarded. According to Viktor Hamburger, Haeckel's law set back embryology by discouraging mechanistic investigation.

Between 1828 and 1837, von Baer published Über Entwickelungsgeschichte der Thiere. Beobachtung und Reflexion, describing his four laws of embryology in an attempt to explain similarities in development across species, in opposition to recapitulation theory. Instead of passing through evolutionary history, he suggested organisms can be classified in one of four "forms", later related to Georges Cuvier's branches (vertebrate, mollusk, articulate, or radiate), from which the organism then specializes. Von Baer's 1828 book has been called the "beginning [of] modern scientific embryology." According to Churchill, Entwickelungsgeschichte "became the exemplar for and totem of nineteenth-century embryology".

Directly in response to Haeckel, Wilhelm His Sr. argued how mechanical forces, rather than evolutionary remnants, can produce embryogenesis in 1874. (Note: Others did similar work in the same period, including Goette in 1875 and Raubner in 1880, but His was most vocal.)

==== Experimental embryology ====
Through the 1870s and 1880s, embryology was primarily concerned with describing how structures and germ layers develop in a normal embryo. However, the late nineteenth and early twentieth century saw an increase in experimentalism in embryology, specifically in the favoring of Entwicklungsmechanik or "developmental mechanics" against comparative descriptions. Wilhelm Roux was the first to promote the idea in 1888. Others had done experiments on embryos before this point – notably Wilhelm His and Eduard Pflüger – but Roux's polemics and experimental success convinced many of its benefits. Roux also spread his message through the journal Archiv für Entwickelungs-mechanik (also called Roux’s Archiv), which he founded and edited.

Various experimental techniques were developed in this period, including microsurgical methods of moving nuclei or cytoplasm between different cells or different parts of the same cell. According to Hamburger, the "uncontested leaders" of early experimental embryology were Hans Spemann in Germany and Ross Harrison in the United States. Both made extensive use of new transplantation techniques.

According to Jane M. Oppenheimer, the investigators of the 1800s were "single-minded" in their focus on germ layer theory.

===== Nucleus, chromosomes, and genetics =====
In the late 1800s, August Weismann proposed that offspring only inherit traits from only the sex cells (sperm and ova) of the parents, not their body cells. This was validated by the end of the 1800s through the discovery of chromosomes. Oscar Hertwig saw the fusion of sperm and egg nuclei in sea urchins in 1876. Between 1875 and 1880, various scientists resolved the basics of fertilization: the spermatozoa or pollen cell enters an ovum or ovule; their pronuclei fuse and begin a chain of mitotic divisions.

At the dawn of the 20th century, disagreement occurred between those who believed the nucleus was the primary determining factor in development (such as Edmund Beecher Wilson) and those who believed it was the cytoplasm (such as Thomas Hunt Morgan). Morgan later became an early supporter of gene theory of inheritance in 1910, alongside Wilson and Theodor Boveri.

Weismann's "mosaic" model of development held that development was controlled by "determinants" which were unevenly distributed through the embryo as it underwent cleavage (division into more cells). In the end, each cell would have only one type of particle, determining how that cell specialized. This was supported by experiments done by Roux in 1910, who destroyed half of a two-cell frog embryo and found the remaining cell formed a half-embryo. (Note: Similar experiments had been done on a smaller scale by Haeckel in 1869.) However, Hans Driesch found that if one of the cells of a two-cell sea urchin embryo was destroyed, the remaining cell continued to develop into a smaller larva, which should not be possible if it only contained half of the determinants, showing embryos have some mechanism of self-regulation. (Note: G. A. Schmidt later found Roux's result was because the damaged cell had not been removed; if the cleavage cells were completely separated, each developed into a full embryo.)

Generally, during the first four decades of the 1900s, embryologists were skeptical of genetics, as geneticists proposed that the genes in an individual were constant over time, while embryologists observed that the expression within a person changes dramatically during their development. (Note: See Lillie's paradox.) Roux had attempted to resolve this in the late 1800s by claiming that chromosomes were split up into different cells, though this was later disconfirmed by experiments such as Driesch's.

Stern says that Morgan led the integration of genetics into embryology, while Scott F. Gilbert argues he was responsible for splitting the two fields, with Morgan saying in 1926 that genetics was about the transmission of traits while embryology was about their expression. Morgan was also an early proponent of experimental studies for the "proximal causes" of development.

===== Organizer effect =====
Hans Spemann and Hilde Mangold's experiment, published 1924, discovered the "organizer effect", winning Spemann a Nobel Prize in 1935. (Note: Mangold died in early 1924, meaning she was ineligible for the Nobel Prize.) It was part of a lineage investigating embryonic induction – the theory that one layer of an embryo causes specific development in another through its contact. For example, Morgan had suggested "formative substances" existed in 1901, and by 1909 Ethel Browne Harvey had found grafting body wall of a white Hydra viridis onto a green hydra induces development of a green hydra.

Mangold and Spemann's experiment transplanted the upper blastoporic lip of one (unpigmented) amphibian donor embryo into the flank of a (pigmented) host embryo. After three days, a nearly complete secondary embryo had developed on the flank of the host. This suggested that the upper lip acted as a coordinating agent, or "organizer", for the whole embryo. However, Johannes Holtfreter (a student of Spemann) discovered in 1932–1933 that many other parts of embryos, dead or alive, could induce complex structures when transplanted.

Between 1938 and 1949, Salome Gluecksohn-Waelsch sought the links between specific genes and organizers. Conrad Hal Waddington went further, equivocating genes and organizers – describing "evocator" genes which make cells available to be induced ("competent"). He also introduced the idea of "canalization", where genes provide constraints to limit possible paths of development. Waddington also found an equivalent organizer in birds and mammals.

In the 1930s and 1940s, biologists such as John Weiss reframed organizers and organized tissue as part of a "morphogenic field". For example, the optic cup induces a "lens field" which extends to the cells around it; when the would-be lens tissue is removed, cells within the field are induced to take its place. Modern embryology has developed a more complex view of induction.

==== Developmental biology ====
After the 1950s, with the DNA helical structure being unraveled and the increasing knowledge in the field of molecular biology, developmental biology emerged as a field of study which attempts to correlate the genes with morphological change, and so tries to determine which genes are responsible for each morphological change that takes place in an embryo, and how these genes are regulated.

According to Kate MacCord and Jane Maienschein, only in the late 20th century did researchers explicitly attempt to unite development and evolution in a single framework.

According to Claudio Daniel Stern, "developmental biology", defined as the production of causative rules which determine organismal growth, came from the conflict of (older) comparative developmental anatomy and (newer) genetics/experimental biology. Hamburger said that experimental biology had a "commanding presence" in the first half of the 20th century, but was "pretty much exhausted" by the 1950s with the turn to the cellular, subcellular, and molecular level, leading into developmental biology. Nick Hopwood said: "In the 1960s, 'developmental biology' succeeded 'experimental embryology' as accounting for most embryological research." According to Maienschein, "In the late 1950s and 1960s, embryology became widely known as developmental biology, with a focus on genetics and development and their interactions."

Genetic mapping (done by Alfred Sturtevant from Thomas Hunt Morgan's lab in the early 1900s, among others) led to the idea that causative genes were arranged in physical sequence on genetic material. In the 1950s, Conrad Hal Waddington developed rigorous definitions of cell properties and events. Waddington also furthered the integration of genetics and embryology.

Starting in the 1970s, new techniques in molecular biology allowed further investigation of key developmental programs; in the 1980s and 1990s, a large amount of knowledge was gathered about the decision-making process of embryos. For example, methods using recombinant DNA allowed for the isolation of specific mRNA-coding genes in a live embryo. Knockout techniques – where certain genes are eliminated from an organism – were introduced in 1989 by Mario R. Capecchi, Martin Evans, and Oliver Smithies. By 2000, stem cell research, cloning, and synthetic biology were used to construct and research embryos.

===== Computational modelling =====
"Computational embryology" emerged in the 1970s, making models to predict and compare how systems interact. Various quantitative models had been developed before the widespread emergence of computers; for example, in a 1952 paper Alan Turing proposed the reaction-diffusion system, which showed how several homogeneous solutions could interact to form stable structures. Starting with a 1969 paper, Roy J. Britten and Eric Davidson developed a theoretical framework of "gene regulatory networks", where genes trigger transcription of other genes in sequences, adapted in response to evolutionary pressure. Lewis Wolpert's French flag model showed how simple interaction rules could cause distinct embryonic patterns to form, suggesting that the embryo is "computable". High-throughput techniques developed in the 21st century led to -omics, allowing mass association of genes and developmental processes.

===== Evo-devo =====
"Evolutionary developmental biology" (also known as evo-devo) was coined in 1983, though the practice of evolutionary embryology existed for at least a century before then.

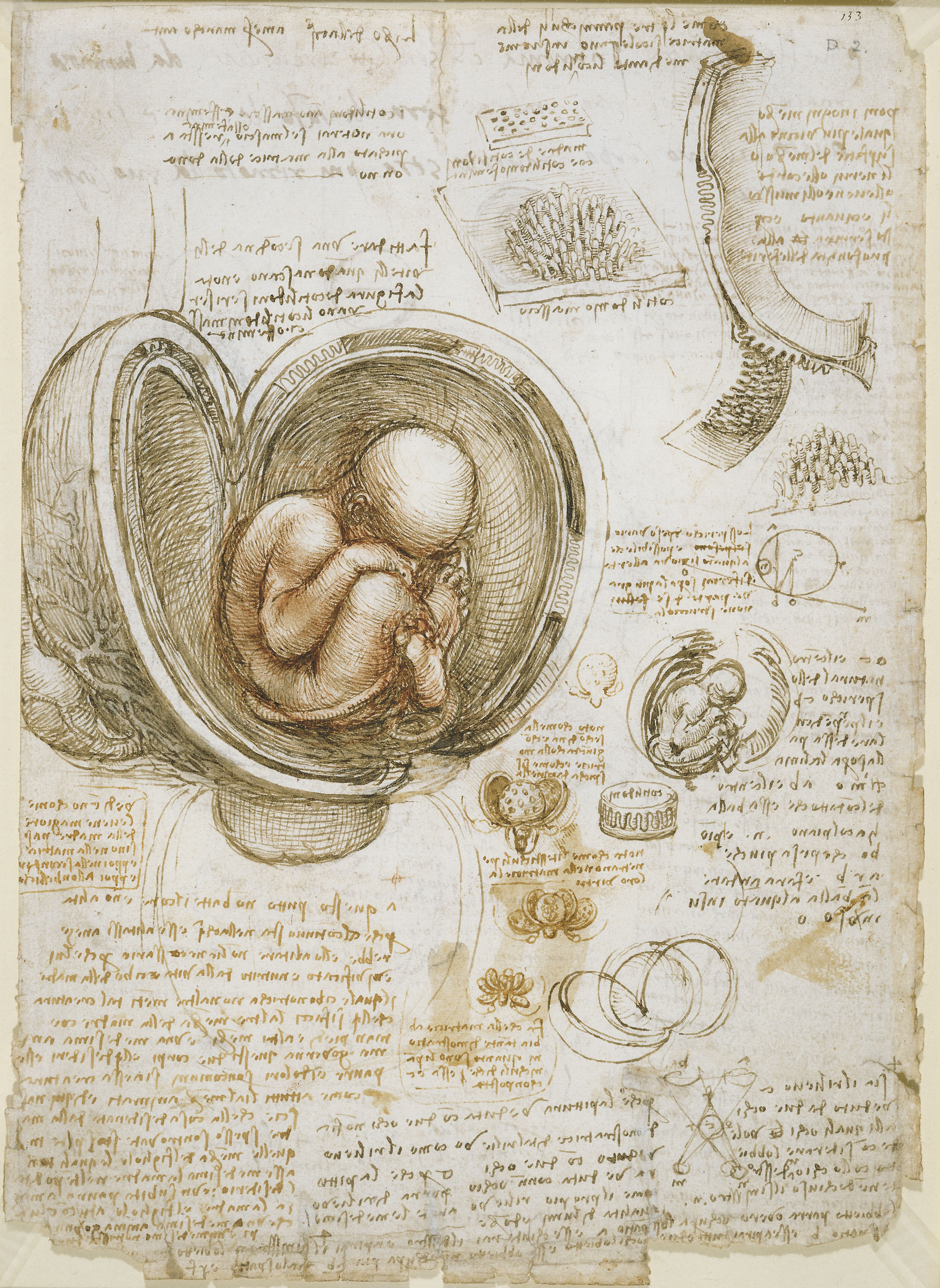
Human embryos by Leonardo da Vinci

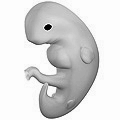
Human embryo at six weeks gestational age

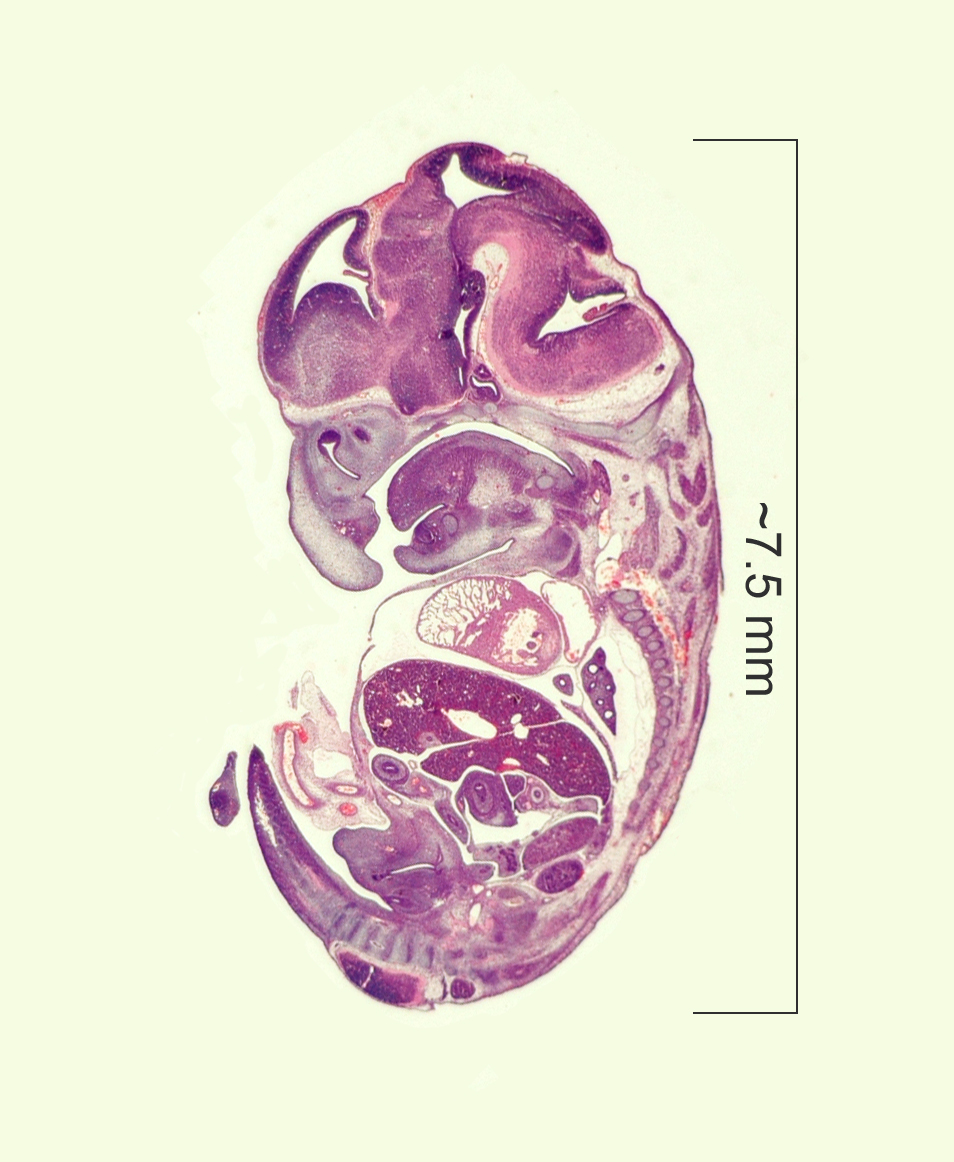
Histological film 10-day mouse embryo

== Religious context ==
=== Jewish tradition ===
Many Jewish authors also discussed notions of embryology, especially as they appear in the Talmud. Much of the embryological data in the Talmud is part of discussions related to the impurity of the mother after childbirth. The embryo was described as the peri habbetten (fruit of the body) and it developed through various stages: (1) golem (formless and rolled-up) (2) shefir meruqqam (embroidered foetus) (3) ubbar (something carried) (4) walad (child) (5) walad shel qayama (viable child) (6) ben she-kallu khadashaw (child whose months have been completed).

Some mystical notions regarding embryology appear in the Sefer Yetzirah. The text in the Book of Job relating to the fetus forming by analogy to the curdling of milk into cheese was cited in the Babylonian Talmud and in even greater detail in the Midrash: "When the womb of the woman is full of retained blood which then comes forth to the area of her menstruation, by the will of the Lord comes a drop of white-matter which falls into it: at once the embryo is created. [This can be] compared to milk being put in a vessel: if you add to it some lab-ferment [drug or herb], it coagulates and stands still; if not, the milk remains liquid." The Talmud sages held that there were two seeds that participated in the formation of the embryo, one from the male and one from the female, and that their relative proportions determine whether that develops into a male or a female.

In the Tractate Nidda, the mother was said to provide a "red-seed" which allows for the development of skin, flesh, hair, and the black part of the eye (pupil), whereas the father provides the "white-seed" which forms the bones, nerves, brain, and the white part of the eye. And finally, God himself was thought to provide the spirit and soul, facial expressions, capacity for hearing and vision, movement, comprehension, and intelligence.

Not all strands of Jewish tradition accepted that both the male and female contributed parts to the formation of the fetus. The 13th century medieval commentator Nachmanides, for example, rejected the female contribution. In Tractate Hullin in the Talmud, whether the organs of the child resemble more closely those of the mother or father is said to depend on which one contribute more matter to the embryo depending on the child. Rabbi Ishmael and other sages are said to have disagreed on one matter: they agreed that the male embryo developed on the 41st day, but disagreed on whether this was the case for the female embryo. Some believed that the female embryo was complete later, whereas others held that they were finished at the same time. The only ancient Jewish authors who associated abortion with homicide were Josephus and Philo of Alexandria in the 1st century. In the Talmud, a child is granted humanness at birth, while other rabbinical texts place it at the 13th postnatal day.

Some Talmudic texts discuss magical influences on the development of the embryo, such as one text which claims that if one sleeps on a bed that is pointed to the north–south will have a male child. According to Nachmanides, a child born of a cold drop of semen will be foolish, one born from a warm drop of semen will be passionate and irascible, and one born from a semen drop of medium temperature will be clever and level-headed. Some Talmudic discussions follow from Hippocratic claims that a child born on the eighth month could not survive, whereas others follow Aristotle in claiming that they sometimes could survive. One text even says that survival is possible on the seventh month, but not the eighth. Talmudic embryology, in various aspects, follows Greek discourses especially from Hippocrates and Aristotle, but in other areas, makes novel statements on the subject.

Judaism allows assisted reproduction, such as in vitro fertilization (IVF) embryo transfer and maternal surrogacy, when the spermatozoon and oocyte originate from the respective husband and wife.

=== Patristics ===
The question of embryology is discussed among a number of early Christian writers, largely in terms of theological questions such as whether the fetus has value and/or when it begins to have value. (Although a number of Christian authors continued the classical discussions on the description of the development of the embryo, such as Jacob of Serugh. Passing reference to the embryo also appears in the eighth hymn of Ephrem the Syrian's Paradise Hymns.) Many patristic treatments of embryology continued in the stream of Greek tradition. The earlier Greek and Roman view that it was not was reversed and all pre-natal infanticide was condemned. Tertullian held that the soul was present from the moment of conception. The Quinisext Council concluded that "we pay no attention to the subtle division as to whether the foetus is formed or unformed". In this time, then, the Roman practice of child exposure came to an end, where unwanted yet birthed children, usually females, were discarded by the parents to die. Other more liberal traditions followed Augustine, who instead viewed that the animation of life began on the 40th day in males and the 80th day in females but not prior. Before the 40th day for men and 80th day for women, the embryo was referred to as the embryo informatus, and after this period was reached, it was referred to as the embryo formatus. The notion originating from the Greeks that the male embryo developed faster remained in various authors until it was experimentally disproven by Andreas Ottomar Goelicke in 1723.

Various patristic literature from backgrounds ranging from Nestorian, Miaphysite and Chalcedonian discuss and choose between three different conceptions on the relation between the soul and the embryo. According to one view, the soul pre-exists and enters the embryo at the moment of conception (prohyparxis). According to a second view, the soul enters into existence at the moment of conception (synhyparxis). In a third view, the soul enters into the body after it has been formed (methyparxis). The first option was proposed by Origen, but was increasingly rejected after the fourth century. On the other hand, the other two options were equally accepted after this point. The second position appears to have been proposed as a response to Origen's notion of a pre-existing soul. After the sixth century, the second position was also increasingly seen as Origenist and so rejected on those grounds.

The writings of Origen were condemned during the Second Origenist Crises in 553. Those defending prohyparxis usually appealed to the Platonic notion of an eternally moving soul. Those defending the second position also appealed to Plato but rejected his notion on the eternality of the soul. Finally, those appealing to the third position appealed both to Aristotle and scripture. Aristotelian notions included the progression of the development of the soul, from an initial plant-like soul, to a sensitive soul found in animals and allows for movement and perception, and finally the formation of a rational soul which can only be found in the fully-formed human. Furthermore, some scriptural texts were seen as implying the formation of the soul temporally after the formation of the body (namely Genesis 2:7; Exodus 21:22–23; Zachariah 12:1). In the De hominis opificio of Gregory of Nyssa, Aristotle's triparitate notion of the soul was accepted. Gregory also held that the rational soul was present at conception. Theodoret argued based on Genesis 2:7 and Exodus 21:22 that the embryo is only ensouled after the body is fully formed.

Based on Exodus 21:22 and Zachariah 12:1, Philoxenus of Mabbug claimed that the soul was created in the body forty days after conception. In his De opificio mundi, the Christian philosopher John Philoponus claimed that the soul is formed after the body. Later still, the author Leontius held that the body and soul were created simultaneously, though it is also possible he held that the soul pre-existed the body.

Some Miaphysites and Chalcedonians seemed to have been compelled into accepting synhyparxis in the case of Jesus because of their view that the incarnation of Christ resulted in both one hypostasis and one nature, whereas some Nestorians claimed that Christ, like us, must have had his soul formed after the formation of his body because, per Hebrews 4:15, Christ was like us in all ways but sin. (On the other hand, Leontinus dismissed the relevance of Hebrews 4:15 on the basis that Christ differed from us not only in sinfulness but also conception without semen, making synhyparxis another of Christ's supernatural feats.) They felt comfortable holding this view, under their belief that the human nature of Jesus was separate from the divine hypostasis. Some Nestorians still wondered, however, if the body united with the soul in the moment the soul was created or whether it came with it only later. The Syriac author Babai argued for the former on the basis that the latter was hardly better than adoptionism. Maximus the Confessor ridiculed the Aristotelian notion of the development of the soul on the basis that it would make humans parents of both plants and animals. He held to synhyparxis and regarded the other two positions both as incorrect extremes.

After the 7th century, Chalcedonian discussion on embryology is slight and the few works that touch on the topic support synhyparxis. But debate among other groups remains lively, still divided on similar sectarian grounds. The patriarch Timothy I argued that the Word first united with the body, and only later with the soul. He cited John 1:1, claiming on its basis that the Word became flesh first, not a human being first. Then, Jacob of Edessa rejected prohyparxis because Origen had defended it and methyparxis because he believed that it made the soul ontologically inferior and as only being made for the body. Then, Moses Bar Kepha claimed, for Christological reasons as a Miaphysite, that only synhyparxis was acceptable. He claimed that Genesis 2:7 has no temporal sequence and that Exodus 21:22 regards the formation of the body and not the soul and so is not relevant. To argue against methyparxis, he reasoned that body and soul are both present at death and, because what is at the end must correspond to what is also at the beginning, conception must also have body and soul together.

=== Islamic tradition ===
A passing reference to embryological notions also appears in the Qur'an (22:5), where the development of the embryo proceeds in four stages from drop, to a clinging clot, to a partially developed stage, to a fully developed child. The notion of clay turning into flesh is seen by some as analogous to a text by Theodoret that describes the same process. The four stages of development in the Qur'an are similar to the four stages of embryological development as described by Galen. In the early 6th century, Sergius of Reshaina devoted himself to the translation of Greek medical texts into Syriac and became the most important figure in this process. Included in his translations were the relevant embryological texts of Galen. Anurshirvan founded a medical school in the southern Mesopotamian city of Gundeshapur, known as the Academy of Gondishapur, which also acted as a medium for the transmission, reception, and development of notions from Greek medicine. These factors helped the transmission of Greek notions on embryology, such as found in Galen, to enter into the Arabian milieu. Similar embryonic descriptions also appear in the Syriac Jacob of Serugh's letter to the Archdeacon Mar Julian.

Embryological discussions also appear in the Islamic legal tradition.

== See also ==
- Abortion
- Embryogenesis
- Embryonic differentiation waves
- Embryology of digestive system and the body cavities
- French flag model
- Morphogen
- Ontogeny
- Shell-less chick embryo culture
