= Epigenetic (disambiguation) =

Epigenetics are stable heritable traits that cannot be explained by changes in DNA sequence.

Epigenetic(s) may also refer to:

- Epigenetics (journal)
- Epigenetic robotics
- Epigenetic valley
- Epigenetic ice wedge
- Epigenetic ore deposits, minerals, mineral assemblages, or structural features
- Epigenetic clock

== See also ==
- Epigenesis (disambiguation)
- Epigenes (crater)
