= Preformation theory =

Preformation theory is a theistic epistemological theory that states that knowledge is possible only because God has endowed humans with certain innate ideas along with dispositions or aptitudes in certain ways. This was recognized by Immanuel Kant as an alternative to his theory regarding the categories of understanding and their source.

According to Kant's view the aptitudes are both innate and a priori not given by a creator. Contrary to Kant's position, the preformation theory avoids skepticism about the nature of the noumenal world (Kant believed that the real world is unknowable). It does so by claiming that the rational structures of the human mind are similar to the rational order of the real world because both are created by God to work together, and this similarity makes the attaining of accurate knowledge about the real world possible.

== See also ==
Preformationism
