= Epigenesis =

Epigenesis may refer to:

- Epigenesis (biology), describes morphogenesis and development of an organism
  - By analogy, a philosophical and theological concept, part of the concept of spiritual evolution
- Epigenesis (geology), mineral changes in rocks after formation.
- The Epigenesis, a 2010 album by Melechesh
- Epigenesis, a video game created during the 2013 Make Something Unreal competition

== See also ==
- Epigenetics, changes in gene expression due to mechanisms other than changes in DNA sequence
