= Preformationism =

Antiquated theory in biology

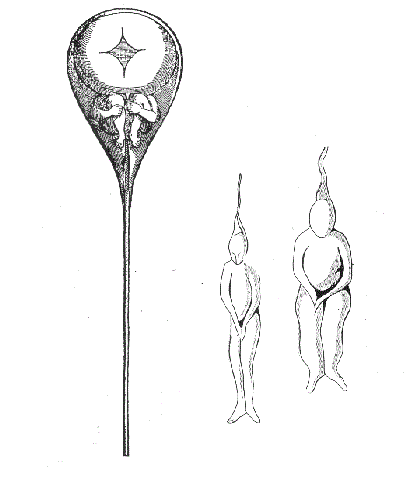
A homunculus inside a sperm cell, as drawn by Nicolaas Hartsoeker in 1695

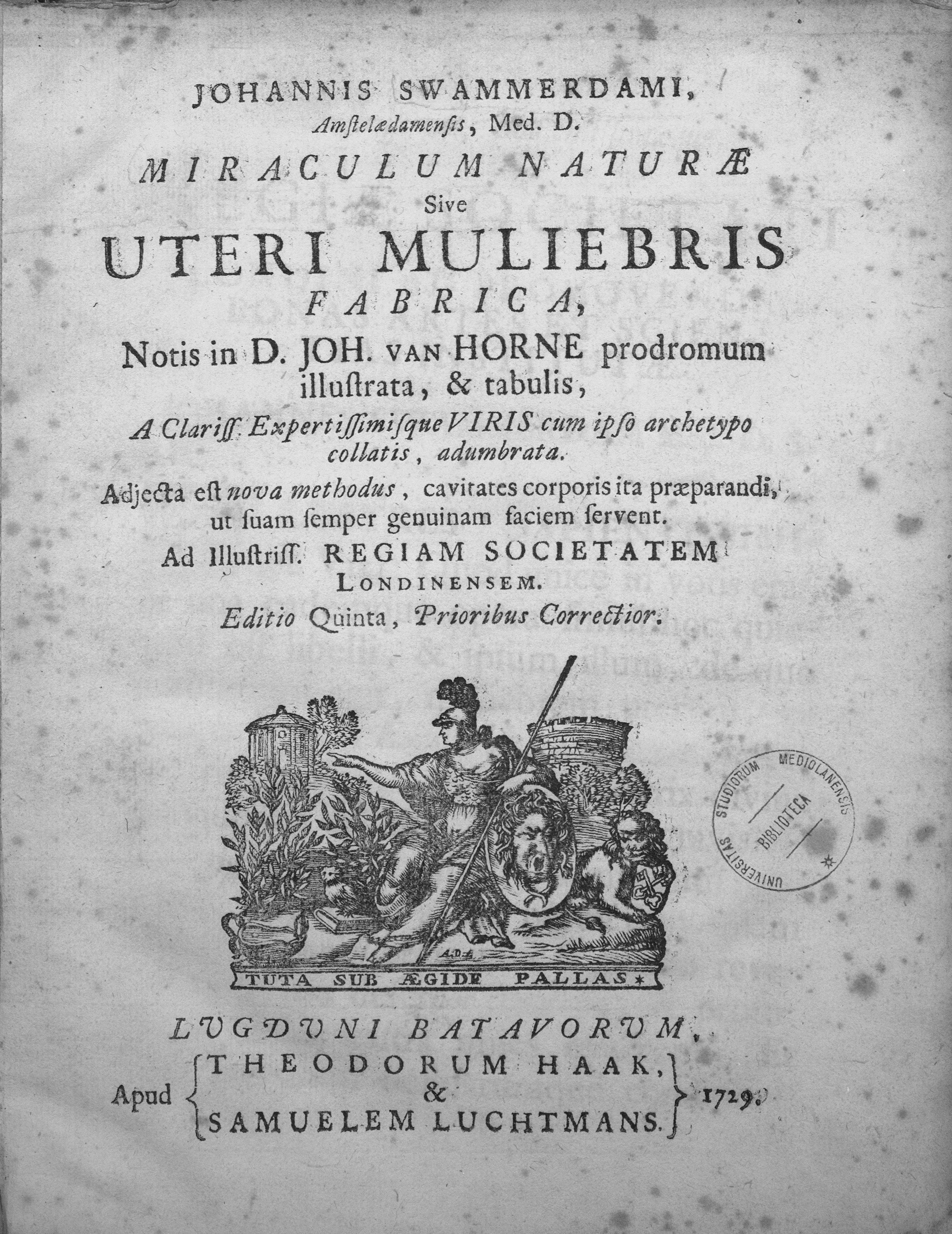
Jan Swammerdam, Miraculum naturae sive uteri muliebris fabrica, 1729

In the history of biology, preformationism (or preformism) is a formerly popular theory that organisms develop from miniature versions of themselves. Instead of assembly from parts, preformationists believed that the form of living things exist, in real terms, prior to their development. Preformationists suggested that all organisms were created at the same time, and that succeeding generations grow from homunculi, or animalcules, that have existed since the beginning of creation, which is typically defined by religious beliefs.

Epigenesis (or neoformism), then, in this context, is the denial of preformationism: the idea that, in some sense, the form of living things comes into existence. As opposed to "strict" preformationism, it is the notion that "each embryo or organism is gradually produced from an undifferentiated mass by a series of steps and stages during which new parts are added". This word is still used in a more modern sense, to refer to those aspects of the generation of form during ontogeny that are not strictly genetic, or, in other words, epigenetic.

Apart from those distinctions (preformationism-epigenesis and genetic-epigenetic), the terms preformistic development, epigenetic development and somatic embryogenesis are also used in another context, in relation to the differentiation of a distinct germ cell line. In preformistic development, the germ line is present since early development. In epigenetic development, the germ line is present, but it appears late. In somatic embryogenesis, a distinct germ line is lacking. Some authors call Weismannist development (either preformistic or epigenetic) that in which there is a distinct germ line.

The historical ideas of preformationism and epigenesis, and the rivalry between them, are obviated by the contemporary understanding of the genetic code and its molecular basis together with developmental biology and epigenetics.

== Philosophical development ==
Pythagoras is one of the earliest thinkers credited with ideas about the origin of form in the biological production of offspring. It is said that he originated "spermism", the doctrine that fathers contribute the essential characteristics of their offspring while mothers contribute only a material substrate. Aristotle accepted and elaborated this idea, and his writings are the vector that transmitted it to later Europeans. Aristotle purported to analyse ontogeny in terms of the material, formal, efficient, and teleological causes (as they are usually named by later anglophone philosophy) – a view that, though more complex than some subsequent ones, is essentially more epigenetic than preformationist. Later, European physicians such as Galen, Realdo Colombo and Girolamo Fabrici would build upon Aristotle's theories, which were prevalent well into the 17th century.

In 1651, William Harvey published On the Generation of Animals (Exercitationes de Generatione Animalium), a seminal work on embryology that contradicted many of Aristotle's fundamental ideas on the matter. Harvey famously asserted, for example, that ex ovo omnia – all animals come from eggs. Because of this assertion in particular, Harvey is often credited with being the father of ovist preformationism. However, Harvey's ideas about the process of development were fundamentally epigenesist. As gametes (male sperm and female ova) were too small to be seen under the best magnification at the time, Harvey's account of fertilization was theoretical rather than descriptive. Although he once postulated a "spiritous substance" that exerted its effect on the female body, he later rejected it as superfluous and thus unscientific. He guessed instead that fertilization occurred through a mysterious transference by contact, or contagion.

Harvey's epigenesis, more mechanistic and less vitalist than the Aristotelian version, was, thus, more compatible with the natural philosophy of the time. Still, the idea that unorganized matter could ultimately self-organize into life challenged the mechanistic framework of Cartesianism, which had become dominant in the Scientific Revolution. Because of technological limitations, there was no available mechanical explanation for epigenesis. It was simpler and more convenient to postulate preformed miniature organisms that expanded in accordance with mechanical laws. So convincing was this explanation that some naturalists claimed to actually see miniature preformed animals (animalcules) in eggs and miniature plants in seeds. In the case of humans, the term homunculus was used.

== Elaboration ==
After the discovery of spermatozoa in 1677 by Dutch microscopist Antonie van Leeuwenhoek, the epigenist theory proved more difficult to defend: How could complex organisms such as human beings develop from such simple organisms? Thereafter, Giuseppe degli Aromatari and then Marcello Malpighi and Jan Swammerdam made observations using microscopes in the late 17th century, and interpreted their findings to develop the preformationist theory. For two centuries, until the development of cell theory, preformationists would oppose epigenicists, and, inside the preformationist camp, spermists (who claimed the homunculus must come from the man) to ovists, who located the homunculus in the ova.

Dutch microscopist Antonie van Leeuwenhoek was one of the first to observe spermatozoa. He described the spermatozoa of about 30 species, and thought he saw in semen "all manner of great and small vessels, so various and so numerous that I do not doubt that they be nerves, arteries and veins ... And when I saw them, I felt convinced that, in no full grown body, are there any vessels which may not be found likewise in semen".

Leeuwenhoek discovered that the origin of semen was the testicles and was a committed preformationist and spermist. He reasoned that the movement of spermatozoa was evidence of animal life, which presumed a complex structure and, for human sperm, a soul.

In 1694, Nicolaas Hartsoeker, in his Essai de Dioptrique concerning things large and small that could be seen with optical lenses, produced an image (the one seen above) of a tiny human form curled up inside the sperm, which he referred to in French as petit l'infant and le petit animal. This image, depicting what historians now refer to as the homunculus, has become iconic of the theory of preformationism, and appears in almost every textbook concerning the history of embryological science.

Philosopher Nicolas Malebranche was the first to advance the hypothesis that each embryo could contain even smaller embryos ad infinitum, like a Matryoshka doll. According to Malebranche, "an infinite series of plants and animals were contained within the seed or the egg, but only naturalists with sufficient skill and experience could detect their presence". In fact, Malebranche only alleged this, observing that if microscopes enabled us to see very little animals and plants, maybe even smaller creatures could exist. He claimed that it was not unreasonable to believe that "they are infinite trees in only one seed", as he stated that we could already see chickens in eggs, tulips in bulbs, frogs in eggs. From this, he hypothesized that "all the bodies of humans and animals", already born and yet to be born, "were perhaps produced as soon as the creation of the world".

Ova were known in some non-mammalian species, and semen was thought to spur the development of the preformed organism contained therein. The theory that located the homunculus in the egg was called ovism. But, when spermatozoa were discovered, a rival camp of spermists sprang up, claiming that the homunculus must come from the male. In fact, the term "spermatozoon", coined by Karl Ernst von Baer, means "seed animals".

With the discovery of sperm and the concept of spermism came a religious quandary. Why would so many little animals be wasted with each ejaculation of semen? Pierre Lyonet said the wastage proved that sperm could not be the seeds of life. Leibniz supported a theory called panspermism that the wasted sperm might actually be scattered (for example, by the wind) and generate life wherever they found a suitable host.

Leibniz also believed that "death is only a transformation enveloped through diminution", meaning that not only have organisms always existed in their living form, but that they will always exist, body united to soul, even past apparent death.

In the 18th century, some animalculists thought that an animal's sperm behaved like the adult animal, and recorded such observations. Some, but not all, preformationists at this time claimed to see miniature organisms inside the sex cells. But, about this time, spermists began to use more abstract arguments to support their theories.

Jean Astruc, noting that parents of both sexes seemed to influence the characteristics of their offspring, suggested that the animalcule came from the sperm and was then shaped as it passed into the egg. Buffon and Pierre Louis Moreau also advocated theories to explain this phenomenon.

Preformationism, especially ovism, was the dominant theory of generation during the 18th century. It competed with spontaneous generation and epigenesis, but those two theories were often rejected on the grounds that inert matter could not produce life without God's intervention.

Some animals' regenerative capabilities challenged preformationism, and Abraham Trembley's studies of the hydra convinced various authorities to reject their former views.

Lazaro Spallanzani, Trembley's nephew, experimented with regeneration and semen, but failed to discern the importance of spermatozoa, dismissing them as parasitic worms and concluding instead that it was the liquid portion of semen that caused the preformed organism in the ovum to develop.

== Criticisms and cell theory ==
Caspar Friedrich Wolff, an epigeneticist, was an 18th-century exception who argued for objectivity and freedom from religious influence on scientific questions.

Despite careful observation of developing embryos, epigenesis suffered from a lack of a theoretical mechanism of generation. Wolff proposed an "essential force" as the agent of change, and Immanuel Kant with Johann Friedrich Blumenbach proposed a "developing drive" or Bildungstrieb, a concept related to self-organization.

Naturalists of the late 18th century and the 19th century embraced Wolff's philosophy, but primarily because they rejected the application of mechanistic development, as seen in the expansion of miniature organisms. It was not until the late 19th century that preformationism was discarded in the face of cell theory. Now, scientists "realized that they need not treat living organisms as machines, nor give up all hope of ever explaining the mechanisms that govern living beings".

When John Dalton's atomic theory of matter superseded Descartes's philosophy of infinite divisibility at the beginning of the 19th century, preformationism was struck a further blow. There was not enough space at the bottom of the spectrum to accommodate infinitely stacked animalcules, without bumping into the constituent parts of matter.

== Roux and Driesch ==
Near the end of the 19th century, the most prominent advocates of preformationatism and epigenesis were Wilhelm Roux and Hans Driesch. Driesch's experiments on the development of the embryos of sea urchins are considered to have been decisively in favor of epigenesis.

== See also ==
- Biogenesis

== Bibliography ==
- Alexander, Denis R.; Numbers, Ronald L., eds. (2010). Biology and Ideology from Descartes to Dawkins. Chicago: University of Chicago Press. ISBN 978-0-226-60840-2.
  - Roe, Shirley A. "Biology, Atheism, and Politics in 18th-century France". In Alexander & Numbers (2010).
- Buss, L. W. (1987). The Evolution of Individuality. Princeton, New Jersey: Princeton University Press.
- Callebaut, Marc (January 2008). "Historical evolution of preformistic versus neoformistic epigenetic thinking in embryology" (PDF). Belgian Journal of Zoology. 138 (1).
- Dolnick, Edward (2017). The Seeds of Life: From Aristotle to da Vinci, from Sharks' Teeth to Frogs' Pants, the Long and Strange Quest to Discover Where Babies Come From. New York: Basic Books. ISBN 9780465082957.
- Francis, Richard C. (2011). "10. Sea Urchins Are Not Just To Eat". Epigenetics: The Ultimate Mystery of Inheritance. New York and London: W. W. Norton and Company. ISBN 978-0-393-07005-7.
- Friedman, David M. (2001). A Mind of Its Own: A Cultural History of the Penis. New York: The Free Press.
- Gasking, Elizabeth B. (1966). Investigations Into Generation 1651-1828. Baltimore: The Johns Hopkins University Press.
- Gee, Henry (2004). Jacob's Ladder: The History of the Human Genome. New York: W. W. Norton & Company.
- Gould, S. J. (1974). "On Heroes and Fools in Science". Natural History. 83 (7).
- Johnston, Ian (May 2000). "Section Five: Heredity and Modern Genetics". ...And Still We Evolve: A Handbook on the History of Modern Science. Nanaimo, British Columbia: Malaspina University-College. Archived from the original on 2017-01-06.
- Magner, Lois (2002). A History of the Life Sciences. New York: Marcel Dekker.
- Malebranche, Nicolas (1674). De la recherche de la vérité [The Search After Truth] (in French). Vol. I.
- Pinto Correia, Clara (1997). The Ovary of Eve: Egg and Sperm Preformation. Chicago: University of Chicago Press. ISBN 0-226-66952-1.
- Ridley, M. (2004). Evolution (3rd ed.). Blackwell Publishing.
- Smith, Justin Erik (2002). "Leibniz's Preformationism: Between Metaphysics and Biology". Analecta Husserliana, the Yearbook of Phenomenological Research. LXXVII.
