= Takwin =

Muslim alchemical goal

Takwin (Arabic: تكوين, lit. 'bringing into being, creation, formation') was a goal of certain Muslim alchemists, notably Jabir ibn Hayyan. In the alchemical context, takwin refers to the creation of synthetic life in the laboratory, up to and including human life. Whether Jabir meant this goal to be interpreted literally is unknown.

Jabir states in his Book of Stones (4:12) that "The purpose is to baffle and lead into error everyone except those whom God loves and provides for!" The Book of Stones was deliberately written in a highly esoteric code, so that only those who had been initiated into his alchemical school could understand them. It is therefore difficult at best for the modern reader to discern which aspects of Jabir's work are to be read as symbols (and what those symbols mean), and what is to be taken literally.

Kathleen Malone O'Connor writes:

From the emic perspective of the alchemist, the act of takwin was an emulation of the divine creative and life-giving powers of Genesis and Resurrection and tapped the physical and spiritual forces in nature. At the same time it was an act through which the alchemist was inwardly transformed and purified, a spiritual regeneration. Such an act highlights the creative and often uneasy interrelationship of Islamic magic and science with Islamic revelation and tradition.

== See also ==
- Golem
- Homunculus
- Abiogenesis
- Tulpa
