= Homunculus =

Representation of a small human being, common in alchemy and fiction

A homunculus (UK: /hɒˈmʌŋkjʊləs/ hom-UNK-yuul-əs, US: /hoʊˈ-/ hohm-, Latin: [hɔˈmʊŋkʊlʊs]; "little person", pl.: homunculi UK: /hɒˈmʌŋkjʊlaɪ/ hom-UNK-yuul-lye, US: /hoʊˈ-/ hohm-, Latin: [hɔˈmʊŋkʊliː]) is a small artificial human or human-like being. Popularized in 16th-century alchemy and 19th-century fiction, it has historically been referred to as the creation of a miniature, fully formed human or humanoid being. The concept has roots in preformationism as well as earlier folklore and alchemic traditions.

The term lends its name to the cortical homunculus, an image of a person with the size of the body parts distorted to represent how much area of the cerebral cortex of the brain is devoted to it.

== History ==
=== Alchemy ===
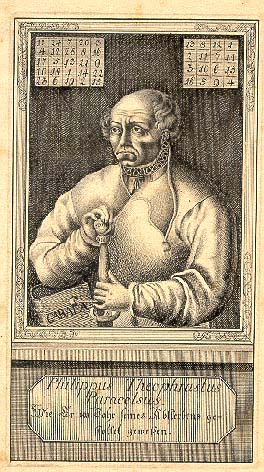
Paracelsus is credited with the first mention of the homunculus in De homunculis (c. 1529–1532), and De natura rerum (1537).

During medieval and early modern times, it was thought that a homunculus, an artificial humanlike being, could be created through alchemy. The homunculus first appears by name in alchemical writings attributed to Paracelsus (1493–1541), although Partington mentions earlier origins, stating that "[t]he idea of the homunculus is in Arnald of Vilanova." De natura rerum (1537) outlines Paracelsus' method for creating homunculi:

That the sperm of a man be putrefied by itself in a sealed cucurbit for forty days with the highest degree of putrefaction in a horse's womb ["venter equinus", meaning "warm, fermenting horse dung"], or at least so long that it comes to life and moves itself, and stirs, which is easily observed. After this time, it will look somewhat like a man, but transparent, without a body. If, after this, it be fed wisely with the Arcanum of human blood, and be nourished for up to forty weeks, and be kept in the even heat of the horse's womb, a living human child grows therefrom, with all its members like another child, which is born of a woman, but much smaller.

The fully grown homunculus was supposedly greatly skilled in "art" and can create giants, dwarves, and other marvels, as "Through art they are born, and therefore art is embodied and inborn in them, and they need learn it from no one."

Comparisons have been made with several similar concepts in the writings of earlier alchemists. Although the actual word "homunculus" was never used, Carl Jung believed that the concept first appeared in the Visions of Zosimos, written in the third century AD. In the visions, Zosimos encounters a priest who changes into "the opposite of himself, into a mutilated anthroparion". The Greek word "anthroparion" is similar to "homunculus" – a diminutive form of "person". Zosimos subsequently encounters other anthroparia in his dream but there is no mention of the creation of artificial life. In his commentary, Jung equates the homunculus with the Philosopher's Stone, and the "inner person" in parallel with Christ.

In Islamic alchemy, takwin (Arabic: تكوين) was a goal of certain Muslim alchemists, and is frequently found in writings of the Jabirian corpus. In the alchemical context, takwin refers to the artificial creation of life, spanning the full range of the chain of being, from minerals to prophets, imitating the function of the demiurge. One set of instructions for creating animal life found within the Jabirian Kitab al-Tajmi involves finding a vessel shaped like the animal and combining the animal's bodily fluids within it, then placing the vessel at the center of a model of a celestial sphere as heat is applied to it. Some of the alchemists believed that these methods originated somewhere in India or Southeast Asia.

The homunculus continued to appear in alchemical writings after Paracelsus' time. The Chymical Wedding of Christian Rosenkreutz (1616) for example, concludes with the creation of a male and female form identified as Homunculi duo. The allegorical text suggests to the reader that the ultimate goal of alchemy is not chrysopoeia, but it is instead the artificial generation of humans. Here, the creation of homunculi symbolically represents spiritual regeneration and Christian soteriology.

In 1775, Count Johann Ferdinand von Kufstein, together with Abbé Geloni, an Italian cleric, is reputed to have created ten homunculi with the ability to foresee the future, which von Kufstein kept in glass containers at his Masonic lodge in Vienna. Dr. Emil Besetzny's Masonic handbook, Die Sphinx, devoted an entire chapter to the wahrsagenden Geister (scrying ghosts). These are reputed to have been seen by several people, including local dignitaries.

=== Folklore ===
References to the homunculus do not appear prior to sixteenth-century alchemical writings but alchemists may have been influenced by earlier folk traditions. The mandragora, known in German as Alreona, Alraun or Alraune is one example; Jean-Baptiste Pitois's The History and Practice of Magic makes a direct comparison to the mandragora in one excerpt:

Would you like to make a Mandragora, as powerful as the homunculus (little man in a bottle) so praised by Paracelsus? Then find a root of the plant called bryony. Take it out of the ground on a Monday (the day of the moon), a little time after the vernal equinox. Cut off the ends of the root and bury it at night in some country churchyard in a dead man's grave. For 30 days, water it with cow's milk in which three bats have been drowned. When the 31st day arrives, take out the root in the middle of the night and dry it in an oven heated with branches of verbena; then wrap it up in a piece of a dead man's winding-sheet and carry it with you everywhere.

The homunculus has also been compared to the golem of Jewish folklore. Though the specifics outlining the creation of the golem and homunculus are very different, the concepts both metaphorically relate man to the divine, in his construction of life in his own image.

=== Preformationism ===
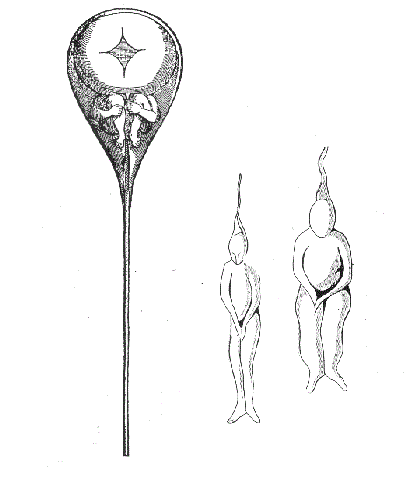
A tiny person inside a sperm cell as drawn by Nicolaas Hartsoeker in 1695

Preformationism is the formerly popular theory that animals developed from miniature versions of themselves. Sperm cells were believed to contain complete preformed individuals called "animalcules". Development was therefore a matter of enlarging this into a fully formed being. The term homunculus was later used in the discussion of conception and birth.

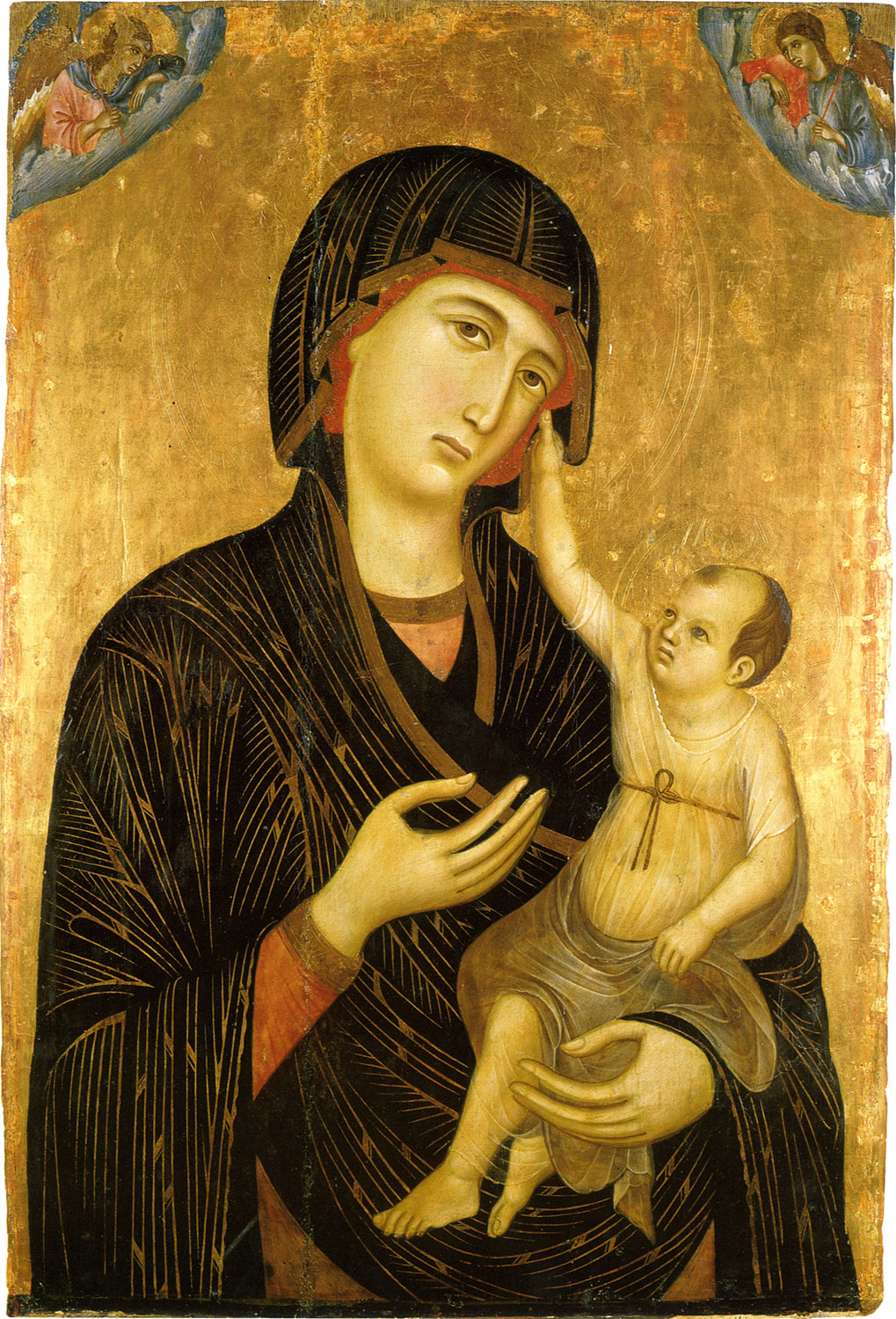
Homuncular Jesus with the madonna

Nicolas Hartsoeker postulated the existence of animalcules in the semen of humans and other animals. This was the beginning of spermists' theory, which held that the sperm was in fact a "little man" that was placed inside a woman for growth into a child, an effective explanation for many of the mysteries of conception. It was later pointed out that if the sperm was a homunculus, identical in all but size to an adult, then the homunculus may have sperm of its own. This led to a reductio ad absurdum with a chain of homunculi "all the way down", an idea also known as the homunculus fallacy. This was not necessarily considered by spermists a fatal objection, however, as it neatly explained the Genesis creation narrative's claim that it was "in Adam" that all had sinned: the whole of humanity was already contained in his loins during the original sin. The spermists' theory also failed to explain why children tend to resemble their mothers as well as their fathers, though some spermists suggested that the growing homunculus assimilated maternal characteristics from the womb.

=== Homuncular Jesus in religious art ===
The Homuncular Jesus describes the trend in European art from the Middle Ages to depict the Christ child, not as an anatomically correct infant, but, as a small adult man. Artists did this because, according to religious scholars of the time the Christ child had a fully formed body and soul at the time of conception and that He was perfect and unchanging, but in parts of the Bible like Luke 2:52 the Jesus grew in "wisdom and stature" so many artists depicted the infant Jesus as a very small man.

== Terminological use in modern science ==
The homunculus is commonly used today in scientific disciplines such as psychology as a teaching or memory tool to describe the distorted scale model of a human drawn or sculpted to reflect the relative space human body parts occupy on the somatosensory cortex (the sensory homunculus) and the motor cortex (the motor homunculus). Both the motor and sensory homunculi usually appear as small men superimposed over the top of precentral or postcentral gyri for motor and sensory cortices, respectively. The homunculus is oriented with feet medial and shoulders lateral on top of both the precentral and the postcentral gyrus (for both motor and sensory). The man's head is depicted upside down in relation to the rest of the body such that the forehead is closest to the shoulders. The lips, hands, feet and sex organs have more sensory neurons than other parts of the body, so the homunculus has correspondingly large lips, hands, feet, and genitals. The motor homunculus is very similar to the sensory homunculus, but differs in several ways. Specifically, the motor homunculus has a portion for the tongue most lateral while the sensory homunculus has an area for genitalia most medial and an area for visceral organs most lateral. Well known in the field of neurology, this is also commonly called "the little man inside the brain". This scientific model is known as the cortical homunculus.

In medical science, the term homunculus is sometimes applied to certain fetus-like ovarian cystic teratomae. These will sometimes contain hair, sebaceous material and in some cases cartilaginous or bony structures.

In a recent article published in the peer-reviewed journal Leonardo "The Missing Female Homunculus" by Haven Wright and Preston Foerder revisits the history of the Homunculus, sheds light on current research in neuroscience on the female brain, and reveals what they believe to be the first sculpture of the female Homunculus, done by the artist and first author Haven Wright, based on the current research available.

== In popular culture ==
=== Early literature ===
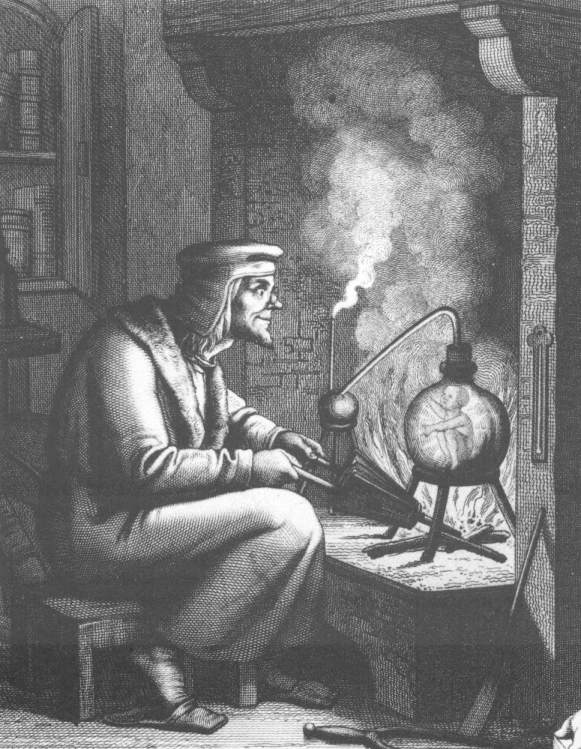
19th-century engraving of Wagner and Homunculus from Goethe's Faust II

Homunculi can be found in centuries' worth of literature. These fictions are primarily centred around imaginative speculations on the quest for artificial life associated with Paracelsian alchemy. One of the very earliest literary references occurs in Thomas Browne's Religio Medici (1643), in which the author states:

I am not of Paracelsus minde that boldly delivers a receipt to make a man without conjunction, ...

The fable of the alchemically created homunculus may have been central in Mary Shelley's novel Frankenstein (1818). Professor Radu Florescu suggests that Johann Konrad Dippel, an alchemist born in Frankenstein Castle, might have been the inspiration for Victor Frankenstein. German playwright Johann Wolfgang von Goethe's Faust, Part Two (1832) famously features an alchemically created homunculus. Here, the character of Homunculus embodies the quest of a pure spirit to be born into a mortal form, contrasting Faust's desire to shed his mortal body to become pure spirit. The alchemical idea that the soul is not imprisoned in the body, but instead may find its brightest state as it passes through the material plane, is central to the character. William Makepeace Thackeray wrote under the pen name of Homunculus.

=== Contemporary literature ===
The homunculus legends, Frankenstein and Faust, have continued to influence works in the twentieth and twenty-first centuries. The theme has been used not only in fantasy literature, but also to illuminate social topics.

- The British children's writers Mary Norton and Rumer Godden used homunculus motifs in their work, expressing various post-war anxieties about refugees, persecution of minorities in war, and the adaptation of these minorities to a "big" world.
- W. Somerset Maugham's 1908 novel The Magician utilises the concept of the homunculus as an important plot element.
- David H. Keller's short story "A Twentieth-Century Homunculus" (1930) describes the creation of homunculi on an industrial scale by a pair of misogynists.
- Sven Delblanc's The Homunculus: A Magic Tale (1965) addresses alleged misogyny and the Cold War industrial-military complexes of the Soviet Union and NATO.
- In Peter Ackroyd's 1993 novel The House of Doctor Dee, the alchemist John Dee attempts to create a homunculus.
- In German children's author Cornelia Funke's book, Dragon Rider, the protagonists meet and are aided by a homunculus created by an alchemist. The homunculus, and alchemy broadly, is seen as more of a magical phenomenon in the story, however, rather than necessarily having a symbolic meaning.

=== Other media ===
Examples of homunculi can be found in numerous media.

Podcasts:

- Hello From The Magic Tavern

Film:

- Homunculus (1916)
- Bride of Frankenstein (1935)
- The Golden Voyage of Sinbad (1973)
- Doctor Who episode The Talons of Weng-Chiang (1977)
- The made-for-television movie Don't Be Afraid of the Dark (1973) and its theatrical remake (2011)
- Being John Malkovich (1999)
- Guillermo del Toro's The Devil's Backbone (2001)
- Shane Acker's 9 (2009)
- Philipp Humm's The Last Faust (2019)
- Yorgos Lanthimos' Poor Things (2023)

Television:

- Bloodfeast
- American Dad
- Rick and Morty (season 2, episode 1) (2015)
- Smiling Friends (season 2, episode 5)
- The Big Bang Theory (season 3, episode 3), played by Johnny Galecki
- Small Prophets, a BBC Two sitcom written by Mackenzie Crook, features the growing of homunculi in bottles in a shed in the lead character's garden.

Fantasy role-playing games:

- Dungeons & Dragons

Video games:

- Ragnarok Online
- Valkyrie Profile
- Shadow of Memories
- The Legend of Heroes series
- Cabals: Magic & Battle Cards
- Genshin Impact
- Bayonetta 3
- Master Detective Archives: Rain Code
- Dead Cells

Books:

- The Secret Series by Pseudonymous Bosch
- Sword of Destiny by Andrzej Sapkowski
- Seventy-Two Letters by Ted Chiang
- Alchemised by SenLinYu

Graphic novels:

- Bureau for Paranormal Research and Defense

Manga:

- Akihabara Dennō Gumi
- Homunculus
- Stone Ocean
- Fullmetal Alchemist
- Sorcerous Stabber Orphen
- Fate/Zero
- Gosick

== See also ==
- Cartesian theater
- Doppelgänger
- Fastachee
- Galatea, a mythical living sculpture made by Pygmalion
- Golem
- Homunculus argument
- Karzełek
- Mind–body dichotomy
- Nuno
- Simulacrum
- Snugglepot and Cuddlepie
- Soul
- Takwin
- Telesphorus (mythology)
- Tulpa
- Replicant
- Human cloning
