= Epigenesis (biology) =

Process of development

In biology, epigenesis (or, in contrast to preformationism, neoformationism) is the process by which plants, animals and fungi develop from a seed, spore or egg through a sequence of steps in which cells differentiate and organs form.

Aristotle first published the theory of epigenesis in his book On the Generation of Animals. Although epigenesis appears to be an obvious fact in today's genetic age, historically, creationist theories of life's origins hindered its acceptance. However, during the late 18th century an extended and controversial debate among biologists finally led epigenesis to eclipse the long-established preformationist view. The embryologist Caspar Friedrich Wolff refuted preformationism in 1759 in favor of epigenesis, but this did not put an end to preformationism.

== See also ==
- Epigenetics
- Epigenesis (disambiguation)
