= Standard Event System =

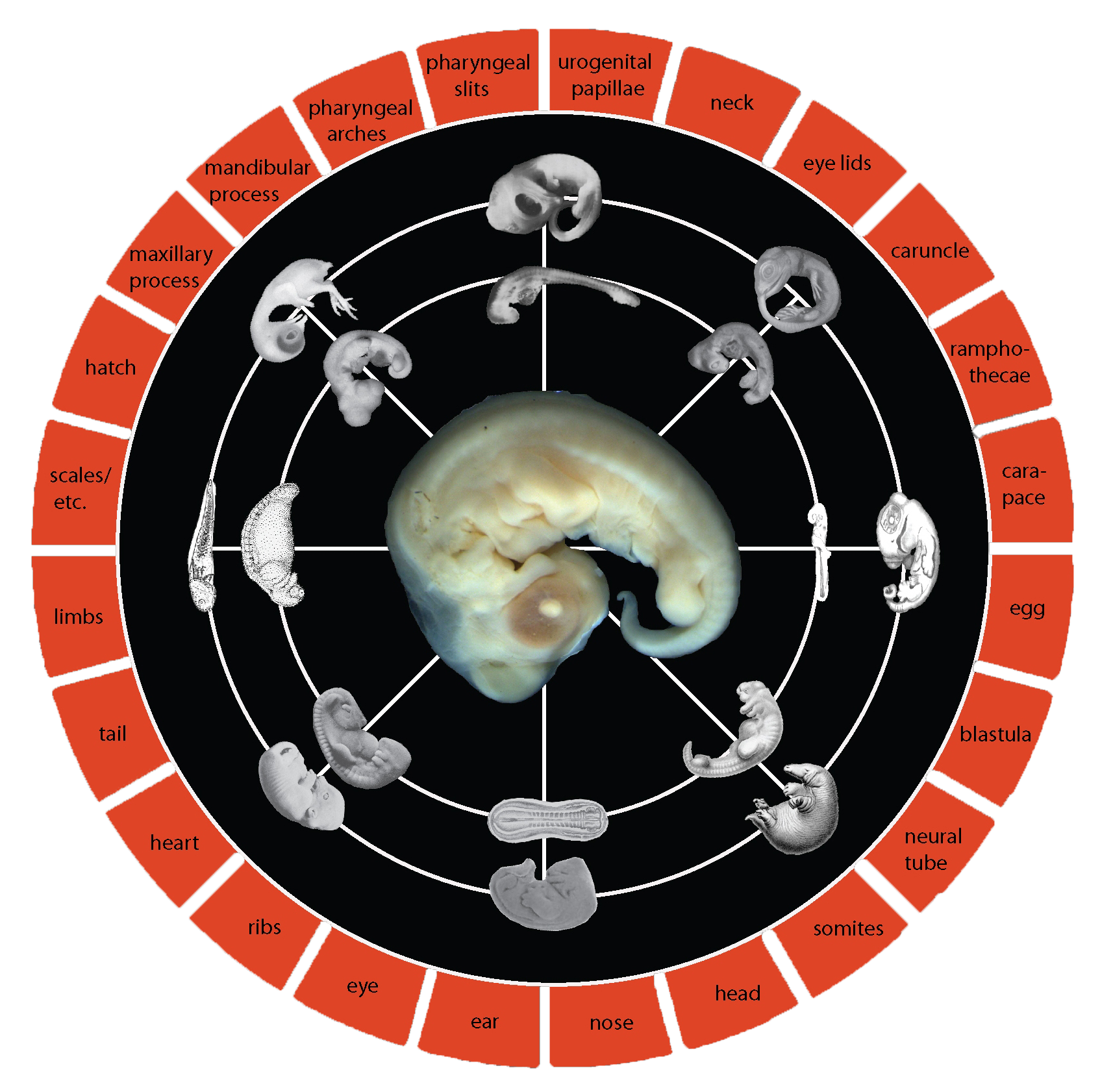
Standard Event System character depiction

The "Standard Event System" (SES) to Study Vertebrate Embryos was developed in 2009 to establish a common language in comparative embryology. Homologous developmental characters are defined therein and should be recognisable in all vertebrate embryos. The SES includes a protocol on how to describe and depict vertebrate embryonic characters. The SES was initially developed for external developmental characters of organogenesis, particularly for turtle embryos. However, it is expandable both taxonomically and in regard to anatomical or molecular characters. This article should act as an overview on the species staged with SES and document the expansions of this system. New entries need to be validated based on the citation of scientific publications. The guideline on how to establish new SES-characters and to describe species can be found in the original paper of Werneburg (2009).

SES-characters are used to reconstruct ancestral developmental sequences in evolution such as that of the last common ancestor of placental mammals. Also the plasticity of developmental characters can be documented and analysed.

== SES-staged species ==
Overview on the vertebrate species staged with SES.

Major taxon 1	Major taxon 2	Species	Reference
Lissamphibia	Caudata	Ambystoma mexicanum	
Testudines	Pleurodira	Emydura subglobosa	
Testudines	Cryptodira	Graptemys nigrinoda	
Testudines	Cryptodira	Kinosternum scorpionoides	
Testudines	Cryptodira	Apalone spinifera, Caretta caretta, Carettochelys insculpta, Chelonia mydas, Chelydra serpentina, Chrysemys picta, Dermochelys coriacea, Eretmochelys imbricata, Lepidochelys olivacea, Natator depressus, Pelodiscus sinensis, Testudo hermanni, Trachemys scripta	
Crocodilia	Alligatoridae	Alligator mississippiensis	
Squamata	Lacertidae	Zootoca vivipara	
Squamata	Serpentes	Bothropoides jararaca	
Squamata	Gymnophthalmidae	Calyptommatus sinebranchiatus, Nothobachia ablephara	
Squamata	Varanidae	Varanus panoptes	
Squamata	Iguanidae	Pogona vitticeps	
Aves	Galliformes	Gallus gallus	
Mammalia	Monotremata	Tachyglossus aculeatus	
Mammalia	Monotremata	Ornithorhynchus anatinus	
Mammalia	Marsupialia	Didelphis virginiana	
Mammalia	Marsupialia	Monodelphis domestica, Sminthopsis macroura, Dasyurus hallucatus, Dasyurus viverrinus, Phascolarctos cinereus, Petauroides volans, Trichosurus vulpecula, Bettongia gaimardi, Macropus eugenii	
Mammalia	Marsupialia	Caenolestes fuliginosus	
Mammalia	Xenarthra	Dasypus hybridus	
Mammalia	Xenarthra	Bradypus tridactylus	
Mammalia	Afrotheria	Echinops telfairi, Tenrec ecaudatus	
Mammalia	Afrotheria	Elephas maximus, Loxodonta africana	
Mammalia	Laurasiatheria	Talpa occidentalis, Talpa europaea, Erinaceus europaeus, Erinaceus roumanicus, Suncus murinus, Crocidura russula, Neomys fodiens, Sorex araneus, Pecari tajacu, Sus scrofa domesticus, Rangifer tarandus, Capreolus capreolus, Bos primigenius taurus, Capra aegagrus hircus, Ovis aries, Phocoena phocoena, Delphinus delphis, Stenella longirostris, Stenella attenuata, Hipposideros armiger, Hipposideros pratti, Molossus rufus, Myotis lucifugus, Myotis myotis, Pipistrellus abramus, Scotophilus kuhlii, Miniopterus natalensis, Miniopterus schreibersii, Carollia perspicillata, Equus ferus caballus, Manis javanica, Felis catus, Mustela putorius, Canis lupus familiaris	
Mammalia	Laurasiatheria	Artibeus fimbriatus, Artibeus lituratus, Artibeus obscurus, Carollia perspicillata, Eumops patagonicus, Hipposideros armiger, Hipposideros pratti, Miniopterus natalensis, Miniopterus schreibersii, Molossus rufus, Myotis albescens, Myotis lucifugus, Myotis myotis, Pipistrellus abramus, Rhinolophus ferrumequinum, Rousettus aegyptiacus, Rousettus amplexicaudatus, Scotophilus kuhlii, Vespertilio sinensis, Mus musculus	
Mammalia	Boreoeutheria	Oryctolagus cuniculus, Spermophilus citellus, Cavia porcellus, Cricetulus barabensis, Mesocricetus auratus, Myodes glareolus, Meriones unguiculatus, Acomys dimidiatus, Apodemus sylvaticus, Apodemus flavicollis, Apodemus agrarius, Rattus norvegicus, Tupaia javanica, Tupaia belangeri, Galago senegalensis, Nycticebus coucang, Tarsius tarsier, Callithrix jacchus, Erythrocebus patas, Papio cynocephalus, Macaca mulatta, Homo sapiens	
Mammalia	Boreoeutheria	Mus musculus	

== SES-characters ==
New SES-characters are continuously described in new publications. Currently, characters of organogenesis are described for Vertebrata (V), Gnathostomata (G), Tetrapoda (T), Amniota (A), Sauropsida (S), Squamata (SQ), Mammalia (M), and Monotremata (MO). In total, 166 SES-characters are currently defined.

Character complex	Character	Character description	Reference	Illustration
A. Egg (V01).	A1. Egg lay (V01a).	Most authors begin to create their staging tables shortly after or around egg lay time.		Standard Event System character depiction
B. Blastula (V02).	B1. Blastoporus (V02a).	The blastoporus begins to form as a lip and is later on visible as a clear depression in the blastula.		Standard Event System character depiction
C. Neural tube (V03).	C1. Primitive streak present (V03a).	The neural plate starts folding. The lateral primitive folds border the primitive groove.		Standard Event System character depiction
C. Neural tube (V03).	C2. Neural folds begin to close (V03b).	The dorsal borders of the neural folds come in touch and begin to form the neural tube that encloses the neural tube. The anterior and posterior regions of the primitive streak remain open.		Standard Event System character depiction
C. Neural tube (V03).	C3. Anterior neuropore closed (V03c).	The neural tube closes anteriorly by final caudal fusion of the primitive folds.		Standard Event System character depiction
C. Neural tube (V03).	C4. Posterior neuropore closed (V03d).	The neural tube closes posteriorly by final caudal fusion of the primitive folds.		Standard Event System character depiction
D. Somites.	D1. Somites hard to count (V04a).	Correlated to the internal differentiation and partly due to the carapace forming in turtles somite borders become blurred in specific regions until somites are completely inconspicuous.		Standard Event System character depiction
D. Somites.	D2. 1-5 somite pairs (V04b).	The total number of somite pairs is count, filled in a formula for each specimen and afterwards grouped within the somite cluster of five somites each. Seldom the left and the right side show a different number of mesodermal segments. By definition the row with the maximum is to be count. Often a somite pair underlies a forming process. This one should also be counted.		Standard Event System character depiction
D. Somites.	D3. 6-10 somite pairs (V04c).	compare to character D2		see D2
D. Somites.	D4. 11-15 somite pairs (V04d).	compare to character D2		see D2
D. Somites.	D5. 16-20 somite pairs (V04e).	compare to character D2		see D2
D. Somites.	D6. 21-25 somite pairs (V04f).	compare to character D2		see D2
D. Somites.	D7. 26-30 somite pairs (V04g).	compare to character D2		see D2
D. Somites.	D8. 31-35 somite pairs (V04h).	compare to character D2		see D2
D. Somites.	D9. 36-40 somite pairs (V04i).	compare to character D2		see D2
D. Somites.	D10. 41-45 somite pairs (V04j).	compare to character D2		see D2
D. Somites.	D12. 51-55 somite pairs (V04l).	compare to character D2		see D2
D. Somites.	D13. 56-60 somite pairs (V04m).	compare to character D2		see D2
D. Somites.	D14. 61- somite pairs (V04n).	Sixty one or more somite pairs, character list to be continued if needed.		see D2
E. Head (V05)	E1. Head bulbus (V05a)	The head is formed as a distinct "bulbus" and a slight strangling (neck) restricts the head region from the thoracal region.		Standard Event System character depiction
E. Head (V05)	E2. Anterior cephalic projection (V05b).	The neck (pharyngeal area) elongates and is at least as long as broad.		Standard Event System character depiction
E. Head (V05)	E3. Head projection disappeared (V05c).	The forming of a mesencephalic (or/and a diencephalic) projection in the posterodorsal region of the head is characterized by a continuing growth and can not be defined as a distinguishable event. But the disappearance of the structure resulting in a flat occipital head region can be well defined and is possibly associated to skull ossification.		Standard Event System character depiction
F. Nose (V06)	F1. Olfactory placode (V06a).	The nasal placode occurs.		Standard Event System character depiction
F. Nose (V06)	F2. External nares (V06b).	Deep furrows between the frontonasal and maxillary processes develop and are visible as invaginations in the nasal region.		Standard Event System character depiction
F. Nose (V06)	F3. Nostrils formed (V06c).	The external nares are closed and nostrils are formed.		Standard Event System character depiction
G. Ear (V07).	G1. Otic placode (V07a).	The otic placode occurs.		Standard Event System character depiction
G. Ear (V07).	G2. Otic vesicle (V07b).	The ear is formed by an invagination and a capsule is forming that becomes large in turtles.		Standard Event System character depiction
G. Ear (V07).	G3. Otic capsule inconspicuous (V07c).	The skin becomes intransparent and the otic capsule is no longer visible.		Standard Event System character depiction
G. Ear (V07).	G4. Pinna fold (V07d).	A pinna fold is formed in mammals.		Standard Event System character depiction
G. Ear (V07).	G5. Tragus (V07e).	N.N.		N.N.
H. Eye (V08).	H1. Optic vesicle (V08a).	An optic vesicle forms lateral of the prosencephalic region. It can be mistaken for the trigeminal ganglion which is proportional enlarged in Tachyglossus or Monodelphis at this early period of development. But the ganglion lies more caudally.		Standard Event System character depiction
H. Eye (V08).	H2. Lens placode (V08b).	The lens placode forms in the middle of the optic cup and primarily has only an indistinct contour.		Standard Event System character depiction
H. Eye (V08).	H3. Optic fissure (V08c).	The optic or choroid fissure represents the blood vessel agglomeration, which supplies the developing lens. It forms a clear streak between the lens and the ventral most curvature of the optic cup. When the lens is completely formed the optic fissure disappears, which is a fluent process that can not be defined as a distinct event.		Standard Event System character depiction
H. Eye (V08).	H4. Contour lens/iris (V08d).	The lens is completely formed and shows a distinct contour. Parallel the iris gets its contour but is often hard to distinguish from the lens.		see H3
H. Eye (V08).	H5. Pupil forms (V08e).	In the middle of the optic cup/lens region the pupil forms. That reflects the complete formation of the iris musculature.		Standard Event System character depiction
H. Eye (V08).	H6. Scleral papillae (V08f).	Between the lens and the border of the optic cup circularly scleral bones occur.		Standard Event System character depiction
H. Eye (V08).	H7. Scleral papillae inconspicuous (V08g).	The scleral papillae become inconspicuous.		see H6
I. Ribs (V09).	I1. Rib primordial visible (V09a).	Rib primordia are visible through the carapace or skin for a short time of development.		Standard Event System character depiction
J. Heart (V10).	J1. Ventricle bulbus (V10a).	Description The developing heart (ventricle) primordium forms a small bulging in the ventral thoracal region.		Standard Event System character depiction
J. Heart (V10).	J2. Thoracal bulbus disappeared (V10b).	During development the ventricle and the liver form a common thoracal bulbus which disappears when the plastron forms in turtles or ribs ossify.		Standard Event System character depiction
J. Heart (V10).	J3. Ventricle S-shaped (V10c).	The ventricle forms a curvature that gives the ventricle an S-shaped look.		Standard Event System character depiction
K. Tail (V11).	K1. Tail bud (V11a).	Although in many references a tail is arbitrarily described very early or in association to the development to the hind limb bud here the occurrence of the tail bud is defined as a distinct constriction of the caudal body region.		Standard Event System character depiction
L. Limbs (V12).	L1. Forelimb ridge (V12a).	It is a lateral eruption in the anterior part of body wall that is wider (anterior-posterior) than long (proximal-distal).		Standard Event System character depiction
L. Limbs (V12).	L2. Hind limb ridge (V12o).	It is a lateral eruption in the posterior part of body wall that is wider (anterior-posterior) than long (proximal-distal).		see L1.
L. Limbs (V12).	L3. Forelimb bud (V12b).	The forelimb bud is about as broad as wide.		Standard Event System character depiction
L. Limbs (V12).	L4. Hind limb bud (V12s).	The hind limb bud is about as broad as wide.		see L3
L. Limbs (V12).	L5. Forelimb elongated (V12c).	The forelimb bud is longer (proximal-distal) than wide (anterior-posterior).		Standard Event System character depiction
L. Limbs (V12).	L6. Hind limb elongated (V12p).	The hind limb bud is longer (proximal-distal) than wide (anterior-posterior).		see L5
L. Limbs (V12).	L7. Forelimb AER (V12d).	On the distal part of the forelimb bud an apical ectodermal ridge (AER) is formed in a horizontal longitude. Often it is only visible as a slightly eruption and in a particular angle of view.		Standard Event System character depiction
L. Limbs (V12).	L8. Hindlimb AER (V12e).	On the distal part of the hindlimb bud an apical ectodermal ridge (AER) is formed in a horizontal longitude.		see L7
L. Limbs (V12).	L9. Forelimb elbow (V12f).	The forelimb develops an elbow.		Standard Event System character depiction
L. Limbs (V12).	L10. Hind limb knee (V12t).	The hind limb develops an knee.		see L9
L. Limbs (V12).	L11. Forelimb paddle (V12g).	The forelimb is thicker distally than proximally. Paddle shaped.		Standard Event System character depiction
L. Limbs (V12).	L12. Hind limb paddle (V12h).	The hind limb is thicker distally than proximally. Paddle shaped.		see L11
L. Limbs (V12).	L13. Forelimb digital plate (V12i).	In the distal region of the forelimb a round digital plate is formed by flattening of its paddle like end in a horizontal plane. The digital plate is clearly separated from the tube shaped leg by a surrounding step.		Standard Event System character depiction
L. Limbs (V12).	L14. Hindlimb digital plate (V12j).	In the distal region of the hindlimb a digital plate forms.		see L13
L. Limbs (V12).	L15. Digital grooves forelimb (V12k).	On the forelimb digital grooves/ridges are visible. Sometimes grooves develop simultaneously, sometimes only one or two ridges are visible first.		Standard Event System character depiction
L. Limbs (V12).	L16. Digital grooves hind limb (V12u).	On the hind limb digital grooves/ridges are visible. Sometimes grooves develop simultaneously, sometimes only one or two ridges are visible first.		see L15
L. Limbs (V12).	L17. Digital serration forelimb (V12l).	The periphery of the digital plate is slightly serrated on the forelimb		Standard Event System character depiction
L. Limbs (V12).	L18. Digital serration hind limb (V12v).	The periphery of the digital plate is slightly serrated on the hind limb.		see L17
L. Limbs (V12).	L19. Finger (V12m).	At least one forelimb phalanx projects beyond the digital web and is longer than wide.		N.N.
L. Limbs (V12).	L20. Toe (V12w).	At least one hind limb phalanx projects beyond the digital web and is longer than wide.		Standard Event System character depiction
L. Limbs (V12).	L21. First claw forelimb (V12n).	At least one claw develops on the forelimb.		Standard Event System character depiction
L. Limbs (V12).	L22. First claw hind limb (V12x).	At least one claw develops on the hind limb.		see L21
L. Limbs (V12).	L23. Hind limb sporn (V12q).	On the medial face of the hindlimb the poison sporn of Monotremata is visible.		Standard Event System character depiction
L. Limbs (V12).	L24. Hind limb sporn pouch (V12r).	On the medial face of the hindlimb a skin fold is formed where the poison sporn of Monotremata can be retracted.		N.N.
L. Limbs (V12).	L25. Membranes between the fingers are completely gone (V12s).	see character name		Standard Event System character depiction
L. Limbs (V12).	L26. Membranes between the toes are completely gone (V12t).	see character name		see L25
L. Limbs (V12).	L27. Separate phalanges are visible in the fingers (V12u).	see character name		Standard Event System character depiction
L. Limbs (V12).	L28. Separate phalanges are visible in the toes (V12v).	see character name		see L27
M. Scales, etc. (V13).	M1. Head scales (V13a).	Scales on the dorsum of the head occur. The forming of scutes on throat and lower eyelid are encoded separately. Due feathers and scales are assumed to be homologous the scale characters are also applicable to bird development. Mammalian hears are formed differently and are not regarded here.		Standard Event System character depiction
M. Scales, etc. (V13).	M2. Throat scales (V13b).	Scales between the lower jaw and the ventral neck region occur.		Standard Event System character depiction
M. Scales, etc. (V13).	M3. Lower eyelid scales (V13c).	Scales on the lower eyelid occur.		Standard Event System character depiction
M. Scales, etc. (V13).	M4. Neck scales (V13d).	Scales on the neck occur. This character is sometimes difficult to define in cryptodire turtles due to the head/neck retraction.		Standard Event System character depiction
M. Scales, etc. (V13).	M5. Back scales (V13e).	Scales on the back (the dorsal) of the trunk. Scales on the carapace in turtles are encoded separately.		Standard Event System character depiction
M. Scales, etc. (V13).	M6. Forelimb scales proximal (V13f).	The first occurrence of scales on a limb. Generally on the upper part of the forelimb.		Standard Event System character depiction
M. Scales, etc. (V13).	M7. Forelimb scales distal (V13g).	The forelimb is completely covered by scales, which includes the cover of the whole leg and the digital region.		see M6
M. Scales, etc. (V13).	M8. Hind limb scales proximal (V13h).	The first occurrence of scales on a limb. Generally on the upper part of the forelimb.		Standard Event System character depiction
M. Scales, etc. (V13).	M9. Hind limb scales distal (V13i).	The forelimb is completely covered by scales, which includes the cover of the whole leg and the digital region.		see M8
M. Scales, etc. (V13).	M10. Tail scales (V13j).	Scales on the tail occur.		Standard Event System character depiction
M. Scales, etc. (V13).	M11. Carapace scales (V13k).	Horny scutes on the turtle carapace develop already in the egg. They are difficult to demonstrate in photographs.		Standard Event System character depiction
N. Hatch / birth / leaving pouch / weaning (V14).	N1. Hatch (V14a).	Mostly, but not necessarily the hatch represents the end of the embryonic, organ differentiating period in egg laying vertebrates.		Standard Event System character depiction
N. Hatch / birth / leaving pouch / weaning (V14).	N2. Birth (V14b).	The fetus is born.		Standard Event System character depiction
N. Hatch / birth / leaving pouch / weaning (V14).	N3. Leaving pouch (V14c).	In marsupials, the young are leaving the pouch for the first time.		Standard Event System character depiction
N. Hatch / birth / leaving pouch / weaning (V14).	N4. Weaning (V14d).	End of lactation.		Standard Event System character depiction
O. Maxillary process of the mandibular arch (G01).	O1. Maxillary bud (G01a).	The maxillary process of the mandibular arch occurs as a bud posterior to the eye. Often it is clearly seen as the anterodorsal process of the first pharyngeal arch.		Standard Event System character depiction |-
O. Maxillary process of the mandibular arch (G01).	O2. Maxillary process posterior to eye (G01b).	The maxillary process lies posterior to the eye for a long period. First, when a clear rostrad development of the maxillary process is recognizable, its position at the level of the posterior margin of the optic cup should be noted. For identifying the level of the maxillary process in respect to the eye the ventral border of the telencephalic/diencephalic head region must be orientated horizontally.		Standard Event System character depiction
O. Maxillary process of the mandibular arch (G01).	O3. Maxillary process midline of eye (G01c).	The tip of the maxillary process is located at the level of the optic (choroid) fissure, around the midline of the eye.		Standard Event System character depiction
O. Maxillary process of the mandibular arch (G01).	O4. Maxillary process anterior to lens (G01d).	The tip of the maxillary process is located beyond the optic fissure and is situated around the level of the anterior borders of pupil, iris, lens and scleral papillae.		Standard Event System character depiction
O. Maxillary process of the mandibular arch (G01).	O5. Maxillary process anterior to eye (G01e).	The tip of the maxillary process is located beyond the level of the anterior border of the eye up to the posterior margin of frontonasal process.		Standard Event System character depiction
O. Maxillary process of the mandibular arch (G01).	O6. Maxillary process fuses with frontonasal process (G01f).	The maxillary process fuses with the frontonasal process and both form a more or less consistent upper jaw.		Standard Event System character depiction
P. Mandibular process (G02).	P1. Mandibular arch bud (G02a).	The first pharyngeal (mandibular) arch is generally the first pharyngeal arch to occur as a bud. It forms later on a dorsal maxillary and a ventral mandibular process.		Standard Event System character depiction
P. Mandibular process (G02).	P2. Mandibular process of the mandibular arch posterior eye (G02b).	The mandibular process lays posterior to the eye for a long period. First, when a clear rostrad development of the mandibular process is recognizable, its position around the level of the posterior margin of the optic cup should be noted. For defining the level of the mandibular process in respect to the eye the ventral border of the telencephalic/diencephalic head region must be orientated horizontally.		Standard Event System character depiction
P. Mandibular process (G02).	P3. Mandibular arch bud posterior lens (G02c).	The tip of the mandibular process is situated around the level of the posterior margins of scleral papillae, lens, iris and pupil.		Standard Event System character depiction
P. Mandibular process (G02).	P4. Mandibular arch bud midline eye (G02d).	The tip of the mandibular process is located around the level of the optic (choroid) fissure, around the midline of the eye.		Standard Event System character depiction
P. Mandibular process (G02).	P5. Mandibular arch bud anterior lens (G02e).	The tip of the mandibular process is located beyond the optic fissure and is situated around the level of the anterior borders of pupil, iris, lens and scleral papillae.		Standard Event System character depiction
P. Mandibular process (G02).	P6. Mandibular arch bud anterior eye (G02f).	The tip of the mandibular process is situated at the level around the anterior border of the eye.		Standard Event System character depiction
P. Mandibular process (G02).	P7. Mandibular arch bud level frontonasal groove (G02g).	The tip of the mandibular process is situated at the level of the frontonasal process.		Standard Event System character depiction
P. Mandibular process (G02).	P8. Mandibular arch bud occlusion point = jaw closure (G02h).	The tip of the mandibular process comes in contact with the anterior part of the upper jaw.		Standard Event System character depiction
Q. Postmandibular pharyngeal arches (G03).	Q1. Second arch bud (G03a).	The second pharyngeal arch, the hyoid arch occurs as a bud.		Standard Event System character depiction
Q. Postmandibular pharyngeal arches (G03).	Q2. Hyoid flap (G03e).	The second (hyoid) arch develops an opercular flap that covers at least one pharyngeal slit.		Standard Event System character depiction
Q. Postmandibular pharyngeal arches (G03).	Q3. Third arch bud (G03b).	The third pharyngeal arch occurs as a bud.		see Q1
Q. Postmandibular pharyngeal arches (G03).	Q4. Fourth arch bud (G03c).	The fourth pharyngeal arch occurs as a bud.		see Q1
Q. Postmandibular pharyngeal arches (G03).	Q5. Fifth arch bud (G03d).	The fifth pharyngeal arch occurs as a bud.		see Q1
R. Pharyngeal slits (G04).	R1. First pharyngeal slit (G04a).	The first pharyngeal slit, which is the lateral opening of the 1st pharyngeal pouch, occurs between the 1st and the 2nd pharyngeal arch.		Standard Event System character depiction
R. Pharyngeal slits (G04).	R2. Second pharyngeal slit (G04b).	The second pharyngeal slit occurs between the 2nd and the 3rd pharyngeal arch.		see R1
R. Pharyngeal slits (G04).	R3. Third pharyngeal slit (G04c).	The third pharyngeal slit occurs between the 3rd and the 4th pharyngeal arch.		see R1
R. Pharyngeal slits (G04).	R4. Fourth pharyngeal slit (G04d).	The 4th pharyngeal slit occurs between the 4th and the 5th pharyngeal arch.		see R1
R. Pharyngeal slits (G04).	R5. Pharyngeal slits closed (G04e).	All pharyngeal slits are closed.		Standard Event System character depiction
S. Urogenital papillae (G05).	S1. Urogenital papilla bud (G05a).	Between the hind limbs an urogenital papillae occurs as a distinct bud.		Standard Event System character depiction
S. Urogenital papillae (G05).	S2. Urogenital papilla bud inconspicuous (G05b).	The urogenital organs are drawn into the body and the papillae becomes inconspicuous.		Standard Event System character depiction
T. Neck (T01).	T1. Cervical flexure 90° (T01a).	During development of different species a 90° cervical flexure can occur and reverse several times. Only the first occurrence of a 90° cervical flexure is to be noted.		Standard Event System character depiction
T. Neck (T01).	T2. Cervical flexure disappeared (T01b).	Only the final disappearance of the cervical flexure is to be noted.		Standard Event System character depiction
T. Neck (T01).	T3. Wrinkles on neck (T01c).	The first occurrence of wrinkles on the dorsum of the neck.		see T2
T. Neck (T01).	T4. Nuchal fold (T01d).	A nuchal fold is forming in the rhombencephalic region.		Standard Event System character depiction
U. Eyelids (A01).	U1. Lower lid appears (A01a).	First occurrence of the lower eyelid. This should not be confused with the remainder of the maxillary process that fused with the frontonasal process.		Standard Event System character depiction
U. Eyelids (A01).	U2. Eyelid begun overgrow (A01b).	The lower eyelid has begun overgrowing the eye but does not reach the scleral papillae yet.		Standard Event System character depiction
U. Eyelids (A01).	U3. Eyelid at level of scleral papillae (A01c).	The lower eyelid has grown dorsad up to the lower margin of the iris or is at least around the lower curvature of the scleral papillae.		Standard Event System character depiction
U. Eyelids (A01).	U4. Eyelid ventral to lens (A01d).	The lower eyelid reaches the ventral margin of the lens.		Standard Event System character depiction
U. Eyelids (A01).	U5. Eyelid covers eye (A01e).	The lower eyelid covers at least half of the eye/pupil. In reptiles the eye sometimes never closes completely.		Standard Event System character depiction
U. Eyelids (A01).	U6. Membrana nictitans (A01f).	The membrana nictitans, the "third eyelid", occurs in the anterior angle of the eye.		Standard Event System character depiction
U. Eyelids (A01).	U7. Eyelid open again (A01g).	The eyelids open after closure.		Standard Event System character depiction
U. Eyelids (A01).	U8. Epitrichium covering eye (A01h).	In marsupials the eye is covered by the epitrichium.		Standard Event System character depiction
V. Caruncle (A02).	V1. Caruncle appears (A02a).	The caruncle (egg tooth) is first visible as a medial calcification of the skin that covers the symphysis of the maxillaries and lies between the nasal openings. Later on it enlarges and fuses with the maxillaries to get a mechanical support for slashing the egg while hatching.		Standard Event System character depiction
W. Ramphothecae (S01).	Ramphothecae appear (S01a).	Horny ramphothecae are sometimes described as "lips" or "labia" in literature and form distinct "beaks" in turtles or birds.		Standard Event System character depiction
X. Carapace (S02a).	X1. Carapacial ridge (S02a).	On the lateral side of the trunk and between fore- and hind limb a distinct horizontal carapacial ridge occurs in turtle development.		Standard Event System character depiction
X. Carapace (S02a).	X2. Longitudinal carapacial ridge (S02b).	The capacial ridge of turtles elongates beyond the roots of the limbs and forms a lateral longitudinal border of the already recognizable carapace.		Standard Event System character depiction
X. Carapace (S02a).	X3. Carapace not reaching anterior (S02c).	The anterior border of the turtle carapace is not yet defined.		Standard Event System character depiction
X. Carapace (S02a).	X4. Carapace clearly limited (S02d).	The turtle carapace is now clearly limited around its periphery.		Standard Event System character depiction
X. Carapace (S02a).	X5. Carapace posterior projection (S02e).	The posterior carapacial edge of turtles projects beyond the root of the tail.		Standard Event System character depiction
X. Carapace (S02a).	X6. Carapace irregular (S02f).	The turtle carapace becomes irregular around its periphery.		Standard Event System character depiction
Y. Hair follicles (M04).	Y1. Back follicles (M04a).	Follicles occur on the back.		Standard Event System character depiction
Y. Hair follicles (M04).	Y2. Belly follicles (M04b).	First follicles occur on the belly.		see Y1
Y. Hair follicles (M04).	Y3. Whole belly follicles (M04c).	Follicles occur on the whole belly.		see Y1
Y. Hair follicles (M04).	Y4. Forelimb follicles proximal (M04d).	Follicles occur on the proximal part of the forelimb.		see Y1
Y. Hair follicles (M04).	Y5. Forelimb follicles distal (M04e).	Follicles occur on the distal part of the forelimb.		see Y1
Y. Hair follicles (M04).	Y6. Hind limb follicles proximal (M04f).	Follicles occur on the proximal part of the hind limb.		see Y1
Y. Hair follicles (M04).	Y7. Hind limb follicles distal (M04g).	Follicles occur on the distal part of the hind limb.		see Y1
Y. Hair follicles (M04).	Y8. Tail follicles (M04h).	Follicles occur on the tail.		see Y1
Y. Hair follicles (M04).	Y9. Neck follicles (M04i).	Follicles occur on the neck (not throat).		see Y1
Y. Hair follicles (M04).	Y10. Head follicles (M04j).	Follicles occur on the head (except for snout region).		see Y1
Y. Hair follicles (M04).	Y11. Throat follicles (M04k).	Follicles occur on the throat.		see Y1
Y. Hair follicles (M04).	Y12. Snout follicles (M04l)	Vibrissal follicles on the snout occur.		see Y1
Z. Hairs (M01).	Z1. Back hairs (M01a).	Hairs occur on the back but not on the tail, the neck or the top of the head.		Standard Event System character depiction
Z. Hairs (M01).	Z2. Belly hairs (M01b).	First hairs occur on the belly.		see Z1
Z. Hairs (M01).	Z3. Whole belly hairs (M01c).	The whole belly is covered by hairs.		see Z1
Z. Hairs (M01).	Z4. Forelimb hairs proximal (M01d).	The proximal part of the forelimb is covered by hairs.		Standard Event System character depiction
Z. Hairs (M01).	Z5. Forelimb hairs distal (M01e).	The distal part of the forelimb is covered by hairs.		see Z4
Z. Hairs (M01).	Z6. Hind limb hairs proximal (M01g).	The proximal part of the hind limb is covered by hairs.		Standard Event System character depiction
Z. Hairs (M01).	Z7. Hind limb hairs distal (M01h).	The distal part of the hind limb is covered by hairs.		see Z6
Z. Hairs (M01).	Z8. Tail hairs (M01f).	Hairs occur on the tail.		see Z6
Z. Hairs (M01).	Z9. Neck hairs (M01i).	Hairs occur on the neck (not throat).		Standard Event System character depiction
Z. Hairs (M01).	Z10. Head hairs (M01j).	Hairs occur on the head (except for snout region).		see Z6
Z. Hairs (M01).	Z11. Throat hairs (M01k).	Hairs occur on the throat.		see Z6
Z. Hairs (M01).	Z12. Snout hairs (M01k).	Vibrissal hairs occur on the snout.		see Z6
AA. Trunk coiling (M02).	AA1. Trunk coiling (M02a).	The trunk is coiled by about 180°.		Standard Event System character depiction
AA. Trunk coiling (M02).	AA2. Trunk coiling disappeared (M02b).	The 180° coiling of the trunk finally disappears.		see AA1
AB. Marsupium (M03).	AB1. Marsupium anlage (M03a).	The pouch (marsupium) develops as a distinct field on the belly.		Standard Event System character depiction
AB. Marsupium (M03).	AB2. Marsupium dent (M03b).	The marsupial anlage, previously visible as a distinct field, now dents to a concave buckling into the belly.		Standard Event System character depiction
AC. Monotreme beak (MO01).	AC1. Monotreme beak (MO01a).	The jaws narrow to a distinct beaklike snout and are clearly separated from the head, i.e. by a skin fold.		Standard Event System character depiction
AD. Hemipenes (SQ01).	AD1. Hemipenes appears (SQ01a).	The everted hemipenes are seen as paired structures sticking out on each side of the cloaca. Depending on the taxa, different forms are possible. The hemipenes are only found in males.		Standard Event System character depiction
AD. Hemipenes (SQ01).	AD2. Hemipenes disappeared (SQ01b).	The hemipenes are inverted and thus no longer visible from the outside.		Standard Event System character depiction
AE. Mammary anlage (M04).	AE1. Mammary anlage (M04a).	The mammary organ is visible externally.		Standard Event System character depiction
AF. Tongue protruding (T02).	AF1. Tongue protruding (T02a).	The tongue protrudes over the borders of the snout.		Standard Event System character depiction
AG. Patagium (flying membrane) (M05).	AG1. Plagiopatagium (M05a).	At the flank of chiropterans, the anlage of a plagiopatagium is present between forelimb and hind limb.		Standard Event System character depiction
AG. Patagium (flying membrane) (M05).	AG2. Uropatagium (M05b).	Between the hind limbs of chiropterans, the anlage of an uropatagium is present.		see AG1
AG. Patagium (flying membrane) (M05).	AG3. Propatagium (M05c).	N.N.		see AG1
AG. Patagium (flying membrane) (M05).	AG4. Chiropatagium (M05d).	N.N.		N.N.
AG. Patagium (flying membrane) (M05).	AG5. Free thumb (M05e).	N.N.		N.N.
AG. Patagium (flying membrane) (M05).	AG6. Calcar (M05f).	N.N.		N.N.
AH. Pigmentation.	AH1. Claw pigmentation.	N.N.		N.N.
AH. Pigmentation.	AH2. Body pigmentation.	N.N.		N.N.
