= Giuseppe degli Aromatari =

Italian physician and writer (1587–1660)

- Born: March 25, 1587; Assisi, Papal States
- Died: 16 July 1660 (aged 73); Venice, Republic of Venice
- Other name: Falcidio Melampodio
- Education: University of Padua
- Occupations: Physician and writer
- Known for: Epistola de generatione plantarum ex seminibus
- Parent(s): Favorino degli Aromatari and Filogenia degli Aromatari (née Paolucci)

Giuseppe degli Aromatari or Josephus de Aromatariis (March 25, 1587 – July 16, 1660) was an Italian physician and writer.

== Biography ==
Giuseppe degli Aromatari was born to Favorino and Filogenia Paolucci, from a noble and ancient family at Assisi, a town in the duchy of Spoleto, in the Papal States on March 25, 1587. His father was a physician and spared no pains to educate his son for his own profession. He commenced his studies at Perugia influenced by Girolamo Fabrici d'Acquapendente, intending to finish at Montpellier, but having to pass through Padua, he attended the lectures of Cremonini on philosophy, and was so delighted, that he determined to remain in that city; and having pursued his studies in logic and medicine, is said to have taken his degree in medicine when in his eighteenth year. He immediately repaired to Venice, and commenced the practice of his profession, and met with the greatest success. Such was his reputation, that he had offers made him by the Duke of Mantua, James I, King of England, and Pope Urban VIII, to make him their physician. But he refused those offers, and remained at Venice till his death, which took place on July 16, 1660. He was buried in the Church of San Luca, Venice. Aromatari left an extensive library, which he had formed at a great expense. It was particularly rich in valuable manuscripts. In addition to his profession, he studied natural philosophy, botany, and literature, and corresponded with eminent men in Spain, France, and Germany.

About the time that Aromatari commenced his career in Venice, Alessandro Tassoni, with Bracciolini, had carried the mock-heroic poetry of Italy to the limits of perfection; but at the same time, Tassoni, being vexed at the enthusiasm of his countrymen in favour of Petrarch, wrote several severe criticisms on the poet of Laura, in a work entitled Considerazioni sopra le Rime del Petrarca, which was published at Modena in 1609. To this attack on Petrarch Aromatari replied in a work published at Padua in 1611, with the title Risposte di Giuseppe degli Aromatari alle Considerazioni di Alessandro Tassoni sopra le Rime del Petrarca. From the preface to this work it would seem that Aromatari had not left Padua when it was published; and if so, it is improbable that he graduated at the early age of eighteen, as stated by most of his biographers. To Aromatari's Risposte Tassoni made a reply, under the assumed name of Crescenzio Pepe, and entitled Avvertimenti di Crescenzio Pepe a Giuseppe degli Aromatari intorno alle Risposte date da lui alle Considerazioni &c., Modena, 1611, 8vo. To this Aromatari replied again, but under an assumed name; the title of this reply was Dialoghi di Falcidio Melampodio in Risposta agli Avvertimenti dati sotto nome di Crescenzio Pepe, &c., Venice, 1613, 8vo. To this Tassoni again replied, with another assumed name, in a work entitled Tenda Rossa, Risposta di Girolamo Nomisenti ai Dialoghi di Falcidio Melampodio, Frankfort and Venice, 1613, 8vo. This book was full of bitterness, and led to further disputing, till the affair was carried on in a manner little creditable to either party. Aromatari edited a collection of the works of several authors, under the assumed name of Subasiano. This work was in eight volumes, quarto, and published at Venice in 1643, with the title Raccolta degli Autori del ben parlare.

The only medical work that Aromatari seems to have published was on hydrophobia, with the title De Rabie contagiosa. This little work is divided into five parts, and gives the history of this terrible malady, with the symptoms and treatment; but it contains nothing that has advanced our knowledge of the nature or treatment of this disease. To this work, which was published in quarto at Venice, in 1625, was appended a letter on the reproduction of plants, entitled Epistola de Generatione Plantarum ex Seminibus. Although this epistle does not occupy more than four pages, it contains the germs of great principles, and laid the foundation of inquiries that have had the most important influence on the science of botany. Up to the time of Aromatari, modern botanists had not attended to the functions of plants. In this small tract Aromatari had evidently commenced that course of observation which was so soon, under the influence of the writings of Bacon, to change the aspect of natural science. In this work he maintained that the seeds were the ova of plants, and that in this respect they resembled the ova of animals. He pointed out the fact that the seed in many instances was not in all its parts endowed with the life, but that there was inside it a little plant (the embryo) which grew by reason of its vitality and became the plant itself. He stated, that if the seed did not possess this little plant in its interior, it would not produce a plant at all, in fact, that it was infecund. All that part of the seed which surrounded the embryo, or little plant, he called the milk of the seed, by which he considered the embryo was nourished. This part is now called the albumen. This milk he said was taken into the system of the young plant by umbilical veins; and when it did not exist, the young plant derived its nutriment from the earth. These views are entirely in accordance with those which have been established by modern vegetable physiologists. They were not intended to be the basis of a larger work, which Aromatari had in view on the subject of generation, but bad health and an extensive practice prevented him from fulfilling his intention. To him, however, must be given the honour of first clearly stating the great facts of the development of vegetable life, which in the hands of Linnæus and subsequent writers have become the foundation of principles of the first importance in the science of botany.

== Works ==
- Risposte di Giuseppe degli Aromatari alle Considerazioni di Alessandro Tassoni sopra le Rime del Petrarca (Padua, 1611).
- Dialoghi di Falcidio Melampodio in risposta agli Avvertimenti dati sotto nome di Crescenzio Pepe a Giuseppe degli Aromatari intorno alle Risposte fatte da lui alle Considerazioni del Sig. Alessandro Tassoni sopra le rime del Petrarca (Venice, 1613).
- Disputatio de rabie contagiosa, cui praeposita est epistola de generatione plantarum ex seminibus, qua detegitur in vocatis seminibus plantas contineri vere confirmatas, ut dicunt, actu (Venice, 1625).
- Autori del bel parlare (Venice, 1643).

== Bibliography ==
- The Biographical Dictionary of the Society for the Diffusion of Useful Knowledge. Vol. 3. Longman, Brown, Green, and Longmans. 1843. pp. 625–626.
- Asor-Rosa, Alberto (1962). "AROMATARI, Giuseppe degli". Dizionario Biografico degli Italiani (in Italian). Vol. 4: Arconati–Bacaredda. Rome: Istituto dell'Enciclopedia Italiana. OCLC 883370.
- Franceschini, Pietro (2008). "Aromatari, Giuseppe Degli". Complete Dictionary of Scientific Biography. Encyclopedia.com.
