= Lillie's paradox =

Apparent contradiction in genetics

Lillie's paradox is an apparent contradiction in genetics and developmental biology: almost all cells in a multicellular organism have the same genetic material, but develop very different forms and functions. It is named after zoologist Frank Rattray Lillie, who formulated a version of the paradox in 1927:

It is apparently not only sound, but apparently almost universally accepted genetic doctrine to-day that each cell receives the entire complex of genes. It would, therefore, appear to be self-contradictory to attempt to explain embryonic segregation by behavior of the genes which are ex hyp. the same in every cell.

Other versions have been given, including by August Weismann in 1893. It was called "the paradox of development" by Griesmer in 2000; the name "Lillie's paradox" was coined by Richard Burian some time before 1986 and spread by Jane Maienschein. The solution to this paradox is that genes are not universally expressed in every cell; epigenetic and environmental factors control transcription of DNA.
