= Epigenesis (geology) =

In geology, epigenesis is the modification of minerals in rocks after formation. Epigenesis often happens near the surface of the Earth due to exposure to oxygen, carbon dioxide and water. Epigenesis is responsible for the formation of secondary minerals in ore deposits.
