= Segmentation gene =

Gene involve in early stages of segmentation

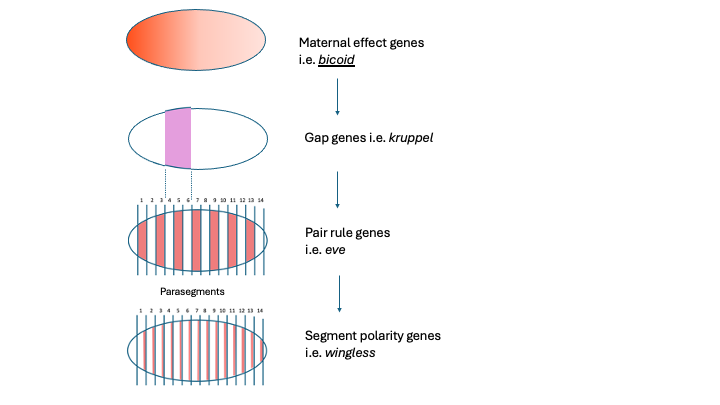
Segmentation genes of Drosophila embryo

A segmentation gene is a gene involved in the early developmental stages of pattern formation. It regulates how cells are organized and defines repeated units in the embryo. Segmentation genes have been documented in three taxa: arthropods (i.e. insects and crabs), chordates (i.e. mammals and fish), and annelids (i.e. leeches and earthworms). In Drosophila melanogaster, a common fruit fly, segmentation genes divide the embryo into 14 parasegments which are among the first compartments to form within the embryo. Rare variants in segmentation genes can cause changes in appearance of differing severity depending on its type. The genes can be classified into 3 groups: Gap genes, Pair-rule genes and Segment polarity genes.

== Gap genes ==
Gap genes are among the first genes expressed in the embryo. Here, expression refers to the translation of the gene. Gap genes were named as such because loss-of-function variants in gap genes resulted in large deletions (or gaps) in the neighbouring segments of the embryo. The expression of gap genes is regulated by maternally deposited factors called maternal effect genes. Maternal effect genes encode factors like messenger RNA needed for early development such as cell division. One of their main roles is to provide polarity and sense of direction to the embryo: which region will become the anterior or the head region, and which region will become the posterior or the tail region. For instance, the mRNA of bicoid, a maternal affect gene, is transported to the anterior region of the embryo and then spreads toward the posterior region. This creates a concentration gradient where bicoid expression is highest in the anterior and gradually decreases towards the posterior. Bicoid along with other maternal effect genes like nanos create multiple concentration gradients that regulate the expression of gap genes. Gap genes are expressed in large sections of the embryo multiple parasegments wide. Kruppel, for instance, is expressed in parasegments 4-6. There are at least 6 types of gap genes but the three that are well-known are hunchback, knirps, and kruppel.

Different concentration gradients of gap genes establish parasegment boundaries. These parasegment boundaries help regulate or control the expression of pair-rule genes as well as segment polarity genes. Lastly, the gap genes also play a role in later development such as giving rise to neurons along with formation of muscles and the gut.

== Pair-rule genes ==
Pair-rule genes are genes that are expressed in alternating parasegments of the embryo for a total of 7-8 parasegments. The boundaries of parasegments are not determined by grooves that can be seen on the embryo but are compartments that show gene expression. One parasegment is made from the back half of a visible segment (not parasegment) and the front half of the visible segment behind it. An expression of a pair-rule gene in one parasegment is followed by a region of no expression in the following parasegment. For example, odd-skipped genes are expressed in alternating even-numbered parasegments (stripe 2, 4, and so on) while even-skipped genes are expressed in odd-numbered parasegments (stripe 1, 3, and so on). They were termed as such because loss-of-function variants in even-skipped genes can cause the disappearance of odd-numbered parasegments only leaving behind the even-numbered parasegments, hence, the name. Lastly, the pair-rule genes regulate the expression of segment polarity genes.

== Segment polarity genes ==
Segment polarity genes are expressed in distinct regions within a parasegment. A parsegment is divided into anterior - the head -region, and the posterior - the tail - region. One segment polarity gene, engrailed, is expressed in the anterior part of each parasegment while another, wingless, is expressed in the posterior region. Loss-of-function variants in engrailed, for instance, can result in defects within the anterior portions of each parasegment. Lastly, certain segment polarity genes like wingless are involved in the planning and development of body parts such as the wings.
