= Genome (Ridley book) =

1999 popular science book by Matt Ridley

Genome: The Autobiography of a Species in 23 Chapters
- Genome: The Autobiography of a Species in 23 Chapters
- Author: Matt Ridley
- Subject: Human genome; Human genetics
- Publisher: HarperCollins
- Publication date: 1999
- Pages: 344
- ISBN: 978-0-00-763573-3
- OCLC: 165195856
- Dewey Decimal: 599.935
- LC Class: QH431 .R475

Genome: The Autobiography of a Species in 23 Chapters is a 1999 popular science book by the science writer Matt Ridley, published by Fourth Estate. The chapters are numbered for the pairs of human chromosomes, one pair being the X and Y sex chromosomes, so the numbering goes up to 22 with Chapter X and Y couched between Chapters 7 and 8.

The book was welcomed by critics in journals such as Nature and newspapers including The New York Times. The London Review of Books however found the book "at once instructive and infuriating", as "his right-wing politics lead him to slant the implications of the research".

== Context ==
The book's author, Matt Ridley, is a British journalist and businessman, known for writing on science, the environment, and economics. He studied zoology, gaining his DPhil in 1983.

== Structure ==
The book devotes one chapter to each pair of human chromosomes. Since one (unnumbered) chapter is required to discuss the sex chromosomes, the final chapter is number 22. Ridley was inspired to adopt this model by Primo Levi's book The Periodic Table.

Chapter 1, Life

The first chapter begins with a quote from Alexander Pope on the cycle of life. The very broad topic "Life" is also the topic of the chapter. Ridley discusses the history of the gene briefly, including our "last universal common ancestor".

Chapter 2, Species

Ridley discusses the history of human kind as a genetically distinct species. He compares the human genome to chimpanzees, and ancestral primates. He also points out that until the 19th century, most scholars believed that there were 24 sets of genes, not 23 as known today.

Chapter 3, History

This chapter discusses the interplay between early geneticists, including Gregor Mendel, Charles Darwin, Hermann Joseph Muller and Francis Crick.

Chapter 4, Fate

Huntington's chorea is used to discuss the use of a particular sequence on Chromosome Four to cause traumatic health consequences. The search for the chromosomal source of this and other related diseases is discussed through the work of Nancy Wexler, someone who may have inherited the gene but who turns to scientific work to study it in others.

Chapter 5, Environment

The concepts of pleiotropy and genetic pluralism are introduced. A brief history of the study of asthma is used as the case study. Asthma is related to as many as fifteen different genes, many on chromosome five. Specifically, this includes a change from adenosine (A) to guanine (G) at position 46 on the ADRB2 gene. The ADRB2 gene is related to the control of bronchodilation and bronchoconstriction.

Chapter 6, Intelligence

Robert Plomin's announcement in 1997 of the discovery of "a gene for intelligence" on chromosome 6 is the foundation for this chapter's lengthier discussion of the genetic basis for intelligence. This included gene IGF_{2}R on the long arm of chromosome 6, which may also be related to liver cancer. Ridley continues his premise in this chapter that the use of simple genetic markers is inadequate to describe the complete function of the genome, or the causation of disease.

Chapter 7, Instinct

This chapter discusses whether the form and existence of language has a genetic component. In particular, "specific language impairment" is possibly related to a gene on chromosome 7. Ridley discusses the scientific disagreement between Canadian linguist Myrna Gopnik and others on whether this disorder relates to difficulties with grammar formulation, or is a broader intellectual disorder.

Chapter X and Y, Conflict

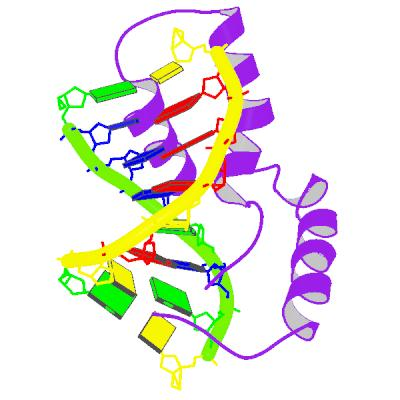
The SRY protein, bound to the double helix of DNA

Ridley contemplates evolutionary psychology using the genes SRY on the Y chromosome, and DAX1 and Xq28 on the X chromosome. The theory of genetic conflict and evolution is debated using the rhetorical question, are we bodies containing genes, or genes in bodies?

Chapter 8, Self-Interest

Richard Dawkins's concept of the "selfish gene" is described by Ridley through a discussion of retrotransposons. This includes the behavior of the LINE-1 and Alu transposons. Further, Ridley discusses the possible purposes of cytosine methylation in development. The chapter also discusses how, through reverse transcriptase, retroviruses like HIV copy themselves to the human genome.

Chapter 9, Disease

For chromosome 9, the book examines the discussion of the blood-typing genetic sequences. Namely, the ABO blood groups and their impact on evolution are discussed. Other genes mentioned include CFTR for cystic fibrosis. Ridley concludes that the Human Genome Project is largely based on the inaccurate belief that there is one single human genome. Proof that this is wrong comes from answering the question, which of the several choices of blood typing genetic sequence is selected, since each one has different disease-resistant and evolutionary consequences?

Chapter 10, Stress

The impact of stress on the human body is described starting with the creation of hormones by the CYP17 gene on chromosome 10. Ridley points out the relationship between cholesterol, steroidal hormones such as progesterone, cortisol, aldosterone, testosterone and oestradiol.

Chapter 11, Personality

Ridley chooses the gene D4DR which codes for the manufacture of dopamine and is located on the short arm of chromosome 11. Interactions between dopamine, serotonin and other serotonin neurochemistry are lightly covered.

Chapter 12, Self-Assembly

This chapter relates to how understanding the genetic code matches models for embryonic development among vertebrates. Ridley discusses 'gap' genes, 'pair-rule' genes, and 'segment-polarity' genes. Homeotic genes and Hox genes are described briefly. Walter Gehring's discovery of the homeobox set of codes in 1983 is related to an on and off switch metaphorically.

Chapter 13, Pre-History

Ridley describes the relationship between the development of Indo-European and other ancient root languages and the classical polymorphisms which map genetic frequencies in Eurasia. The interplay between the breast cancer genes BRCA2 on chromosome 13 and BRCA1 on chromosome 17 help to illustrate these larger concepts. Ridley also describes genetic studies of different types of peoples to isolate why people developed a mutation allowing adults to digest lactase in adulthood. He concludes that since the herding tribes of the world all evolved this mutation earliest, these people's genes adapted to their environment. This may sound like Lamarck's tale of the blacksmith's strong arms 'handed down' to his sons, but it is not. The controversial conclusion is that willed action can alter our evolutionary history and genetic composition, by changing the environment to which we have to adapt.

Chapter 14, Immortality

This chapter examines the so-called "immortality" of the genetic code - i.e. how is it that genetic code can remain as precise as it has been for 50 billion copyings since the dawn of life? Part of the answer is in the protein enzyme telomerase, lying on chromosome 14 and coded by the gene TEP1.

Chapter 15, Sex

Ridley discusses two chromosome 15 genetic diseases, Prader-Willi syndrome and Angelman's syndrome: Prader-Willi inherited from the father, Angelman's from the mother, through sexual antagonism and the placenta's control by paternal genes.

Chapter 16, Memory

Ridley debates the old knowledge versus instinct problem, claiming that natural selection will be the explanation of the instinct for grammar, and noting that many animals including invertebrates can learn. All the same, he argues that the brain is controlled by genes and gene products.

Chapter 17, Death

The TP53 gene on chromosome 17 suppresses cancer cells, while oncogenes stimulate cell growth and can cause cancer if kept switched on, while TP53 can cause cancer when kept switched off. Other mutator genes like BRCA1 and BRCA2 contribute to breast cancer.

Chapter 18, Cures

Recombinant DNA enabled genetic manipulation with restriction enzymes and a ligase. Genetic engineering has been highly controversial, especially in food production; it might, writes Ridley, one day be used in humans.

Chapter 19, Prevention

It might be possible to prevent or cure Alzheimer's disease and coronary heart disease. APO genes like APOE influence fat and cholesterol metabolism. The E4 allele of EPOE contributes to the plaque buildup of Alzheimer's. Genetic testing may help patients take early preventative action.

Chapter 20, Politics

The sheep brain disease scrapie appeared to be infectious but did not involve a microorganism. The disaster of Creutzfeldt–Jakob disease in humans was found to be caused by the PRP gene which produces a prion protein that aggregates into clumps, destroying brain cells. Ridley attacks the panicky handling of prion disease outbreaks by governments.

Chapter 21, Eugenics

Eugenics a century ago, based on faulty knowledge of genetics, led to immoral actions by governments and the US Supreme Court, pushing through compulsory sterilization of people such as those with trisomy 21 which causes Down syndrome. Ridley discusses the conflict between society, in the form of the state, and the individual.

Chapter 22, Free Will

Ridley addresses the heated debate between genetic determinism and freedom. Children are moulded both by their peers (other children) and by their genes. He argues that behaviour is in the short term unpredictable, but "broadly" predictable in the long term.

== Reception ==
Genome has been reviewed in scientific journals including Nature and in medical journals such as the New England Journal of Medicine, where Robert Schwartz notes that Ridley speculates, "sometimes wildly". The book is a "gambol" through the human chromosomes. All the same, Schwartz writes, the book is "instructive, challenging, and fun to read. I envy Ridley's talent for presenting, without condescension, complex sets of facts and ideas in terms comprehensible to outsiders."

Lee M. Silver, reviewing Genome in The New York Times, argues that the book's theme is that each individual's genome contains "echoes" (Ridley's word) of their ancestors' lives. Silver calls Ridley "adamant" in believing that the use of "personal genetics" must not be left for doctors or governments to control, following on from the mistakes of eugenics a century ago, but that it's a fundamental human right to "see and use the messages in their own DNA as they see fit." Silver describes the book as remarkable for focusing on "pure intellectual discovery", providing "delightful stories". He suggests that even practising geneticists will gain a sense of wonder from the "hidden secrets" in the book.

The biologist Jerry Coyne, writing in the London Review of Books, criticises Genome as "at once instructive and infuriating. For each nugget of science, Ridley also includes an error or misrepresentation. Some of these derive from poor scholarship: others from his political agenda." For example, Coyne mentions Ridley's incorrect claim that "half of your IQ is inherited"; that Ridley assumes that the marker used by Robert Plomin, IGF2R, is the purported "intelligence gene" that it marks; and that social influences on behaviour [always] work by switching genes on and off, something that Coyne states is "occasionally true". Coyne argues that Ridley is an "implacable" genetic determinist, denying the influence of the environment, and calling his politics "right-wing". He calls the book's structure "eccentric" and "bizarre", the chapters matching the 23 pairs of human chromosomes, and notes that Genome is the third of Ridley's books that "tries to popularise" evolutionary psychology.

The science writer Michael Shermer finds Ridley's technique "at once clever and delimiting: Each chapter represents a chromosome, for which he has chosen a single entity supposedly determined or influenced by that chromosome." In Shermer's view, "It is a facile literary device to help readers get their minds around this illimitable subject, but I fear that it gives the wrong impression, disclaimers notwithstanding, that such things as intelligence, instinct, or self-interest are wholly located on that chromosome (and, therefore, genetically programmed and biologically determined)."

== Awards and distinctions ==
Genome was shortlisted for the Samuel Johnson Prize in 2000.
