= Ultrabithorax =

Protein-coding gene found in Drosophila melanogaster

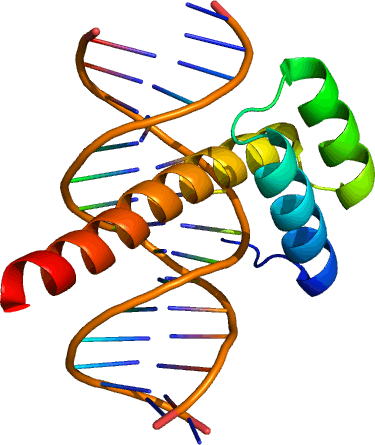
- Crystallographic structure of ultrabithorax complexed with double stranded DNA.

Identifiers
- Organism: Drosophila melanogaster
- Symbol: Ubx
- Entrez: 42034
- Orthologs: NCBI: entry; OMA: entry
- PDB: 4UUT
- RefSeq (mRNA): NM_206497.3
- RefSeq (Prot): NP_996219.1
- UniProt: P83949

Other data
- Chromosome: 3R: 16.64 - 16.75 Mb
Search for
- Structures: Swiss-model
- Domains: InterPro

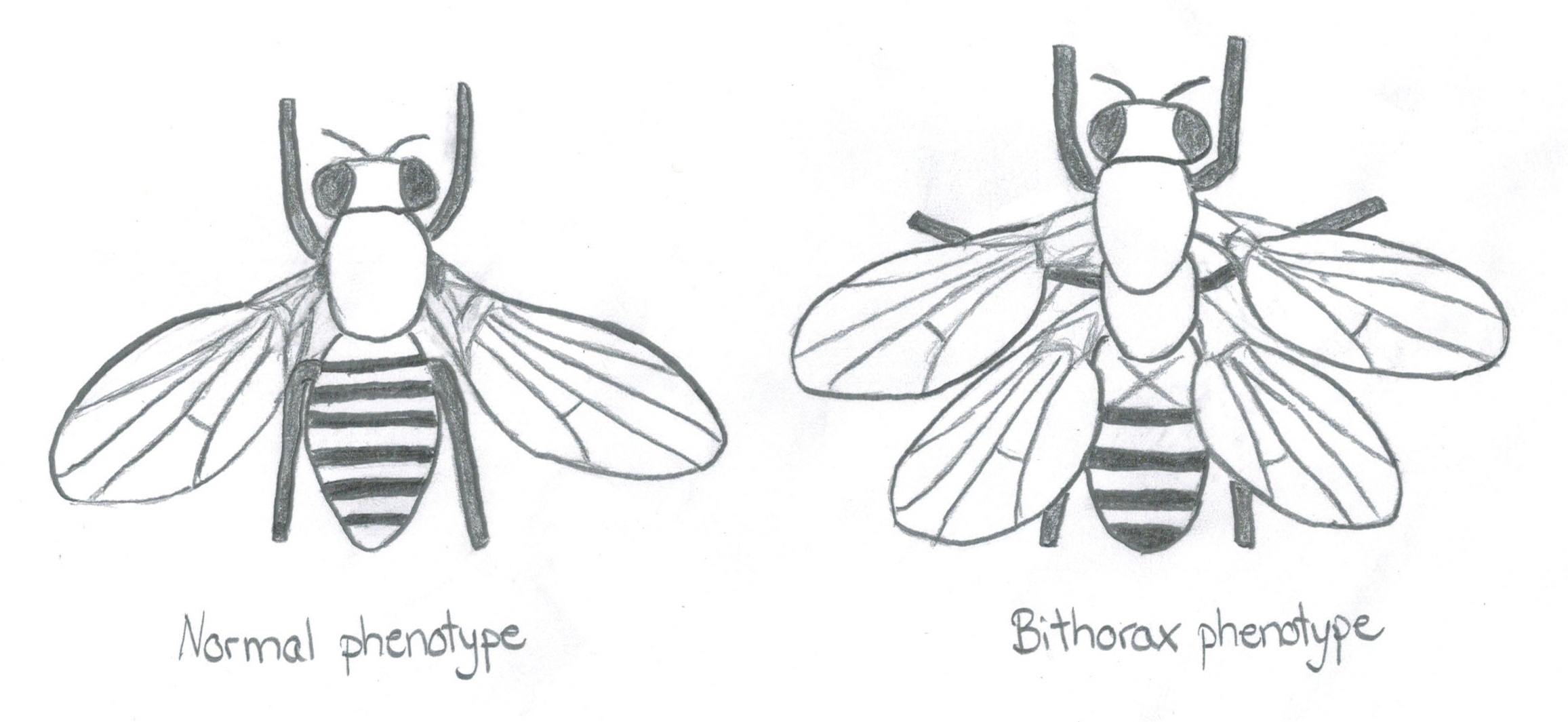
Figure 1 - Mutations in the Ubx gene lead to transformation of appendages in T2 and T3 segments, resulting in a second set of wings observed in the "bithorax" phenotype.

Ultrabithorax (Ubx) is a homeobox gene found in insects, and is used in the regulation of patterning in morphogenesis. There are many possible products of this gene, which function as transcription factors. Ubx is used in the specification of serially homologous structures, and is used at many levels of developmental hierarchies. In Drosophila melanogaster it is expressed in the third thoracic (T3) and first abdominal (A1) segments and represses wing formation. The Ubx gene regulates the decisions regarding the number of wings and legs the adult flies will have. The developmental role of the Ubx gene is determined by the splicing of its product, which takes place after translation of the gene. The specific splice factors of a particular cell allow the specific regulation of the developmental fate of that cell, by making different splice variants of transcription factors. In D. melanogaster, at least six different isoforms of Ubx exist.

Mutations of the Ubx gene will lead to transformation of dorsal and ventral appendages of the third thoracic segment (T3), which includes the haltere and third leg, into the counterparts on the second thoracic segment (T2). If Ubx is present in T3, it will prevent the original fate of the T2 segment. Such mutations can produce the second set of wings observed in the bithorax phenotype.

== Structure ==
The Ubx gene contains a 5' exon, two micro-exons, an optional B element, and a C terminal exon. The Ubx genomic DNA length is 76 kb and its cDNA clone length is 3.2 to 4.6 kb. The 5' exon contains the 5'UTR which has 964 bases. The C terminal exon contains the 3'UTR which has 1580 to 2212 bases.

== Target genes ==
Ubx targets hundreds of different genes at different stages of morphogenesis including regulatory genes such as transcription factors, signalling components and terminal differentiation genes. Ubx has been shown to act upon long-range signaling molecules, as well as their target genes and subsequent genes further downstream. It has been shown to act at many levels of regulatory hierarchies, meaning Ubx can be used as a signal more than once in the same regulatory hierarchy.

Ubx represses selected Dpp (Decapentaplegic-activated) target genes in the anterior and posterior axis. Several Dpp target genes which have been identified are spalt-related, vestigial, Serum Response Factor, and achaete-scute. Ubx also represses Wingless in the posterior compartment of the dorsoventral axis. The products of these genes are used in the regulation of morphological features between the wing and the haltere.

Ubx also selectively represses one enhancer of the vestigial genes in the proximodistal axis.

This gene is important for the development of hindwings in Lepidoptera, and leg development in larvae.

== Regulation ==
Ubx is activated when there is a certain lack of Hunchback (hb) protein. Significant concentrations of Hunchback only exist in the anterior and posterior regions of the embryo, therefore Ubx is expressed only in middle segments. Thus, the hb gene may play an important role in the specification of the boundaries of Ubx expression.

Activation of Ubx involves multiple cis-acting regulatory sequences, which are found upstream and downstream of the mRNA cap-site. These enhancer regions can activate transcription of Ubx if the right combination of factors is present. For example, it has been shown that Ubx expression in the third femur of D. melanogaster is dependent on the enhancer regions abx and pbx. Transcription factors which bind to the promoter site of Ubx have been purified and shown to activate expression of the gene in vitro.

Expression of Ubx is repressed by the long non-coding RNA Bithoraxoid (Bxd), using transcriptional interference to silence expression.

== Ubx Biomaterials ==
Besides being a well known transcription factor, Ubx has been used to form biomaterials in vitro. Macroscale materials in the form of ropes, films and sheets can be generated from recombinant Ubx protein, which can self-assemble under gentler conditions than other biomaterial proteins. The macroscale materials self-adhere, allowing them to assume more complex structures. In addition to requiring less harsh conditions than other proteins, Ubx has been shown to assemble more rapidly and at much lower concentrations.

Ubx materials are mechanically robust. By altering fiber diameter, the breaking strength, breaking strain, and Young’s modulus can be tuned to values spanning an order of magnitude, ultimately changing the mechanism of extension.
