= Gooseberry (disambiguation) =

Gooseberry most often refers to a cultivated plant from two species of the genus Ribes:

- Ribes uva-crispa native to Europe, northwestern Africa and southwestern Asia.
- Ribes hirtellum, American gooseberry
- Hybrids between Ribes hirtellum and Ribes uva-crispa, including most of the cultivated gooseberry cultivars

Gooseberry may also refer to:

- Gooseberry (gene), a pair-rule gene in Drosophila
- Gooseberry, a structural element of the artificial Mulberry harbours used in World War II
- Sea gooseberry, a common name for some ctenophores (comb jellies), particularly Pleurobrachia
- Gooseberries (short story), an 1898 short story by Anton Chekhov

== Places ==
- Gooseberry, Oregon, an unincorporated community
- Gooseberry Beach, a beach in Newport, Rhode Island
- Gooseberry Cove, a settlement near Trinity Bay, Newfoundland & Labrador
- Gooseberry Falls, a state park in Silver Creek Township, Lake County, Minnesota
- Gooseberry Hill, a suburb of Perth, Western Australia
- Gooseberry Island, Newfoundland and Labrador, a former settlement near Bonavista, Newfoundland & Labrador
- Gooseberry Lake, a lake in Saskatchewan, Canada
- Gooseberry Lake Provincial Park, a park in Alberta, Canada
- Gooseberry Point, port/dock near Lummi Island, Washington, United States
