= Gooseberry Island =

Gooseberry Island can refer to:

- Gooseberry Island, Newfoundland and Labrador, Canada
- Gooseberry Island (Massachusetts), United States
