= Zerknüllt =

Protein family

Zerknüllt 1

Identifiers
- Organism: Drosophila melanogaster
- Symbol: zen
- UniProt: P09089
Search for
- Structures: Swiss-model
- Domains: InterPro

Zerknüllt 2

Identifiers
- Organism: Drosophila melanogaster
- Symbol: zen2
- UniProt: P09090
Search for
- Structures: Swiss-model
- Domains: InterPro

Zerknüllt (zen, German for "crumpled") is a gene in the Antennapedia complex of Drosophila (fruit flies) and other insects, where it operates very differently from the canonical Hox genes in the same gene cluster. Comparison of Hox genes between species showed that the Zerknüllt gene evolved from one of the standard Hox genes (the 'paralogy group 3' Hox gene) in insects through accumulating many amino acid changes, changing expression pattern, losing ancestral function and gaining a new function.

Zerknüllt codes for a homeoprotein regulates aspects of early embryogenesis in insects. Unlike the canonical Hox genes which are expressed in precise zones along the anteroposterior (head to tail) body axis, zerknüllt expression is restricted along the dorsoventral (back to belly) body axis. Expression of Zerknüllt is repressed in the ventral part of the embryo by a protein called Dorsal, and activated in the dorsal part of the embryo by the TGF beta signaling pathway. The cells which activate the Zerknüllt develop into extraembryonic tissues which surround the developing insect embryo.

Zerknüllt has been found to undergo a number of gene duplications in certain insect lineages. For example, in the beetle Tribolium castaneum zen duplicated to yield zen and zen2; in many flies, including Drosophila, zen duplicated to give zen, zen2 and the even more divergent Bicoid gene. Large expansions of zen through gene duplication have also been observed within Lepidoptera. In this group, zen has duplicated at least four times resulting in the emergence of the additional divergent 'Special homeobox' (Shx) genes, named ShxA, ShxB, ShxC and ShxD. The original zen gene is still present. In some lepidopteran species, such as the Domesticated Silkmoth Bombyx mori, even greater numbers of duplications of zen occurred, with 12 Shx loci annotated along with zen.

== See also ==
- Drosophila embryogenesis
- Regional specification
