= Dorsal =

Dorsal (from Latin dorsum ‘back’) may refer to:

- Dorsal (anatomy), an anatomical term of location referring to the back or upper side of an organism or parts of an organism
- Dorsal, positioned on top of an aircraft's fuselage
- Dorsal consonant, a consonant articulated with the back of the tongue
- Dorsal fin, the fin located on the back of a fish or aircraft
- Dorsal transcription factor, a maternally synthesized transcription factor
