= Germ-band extension =

Morphogenic process during embryogenesis

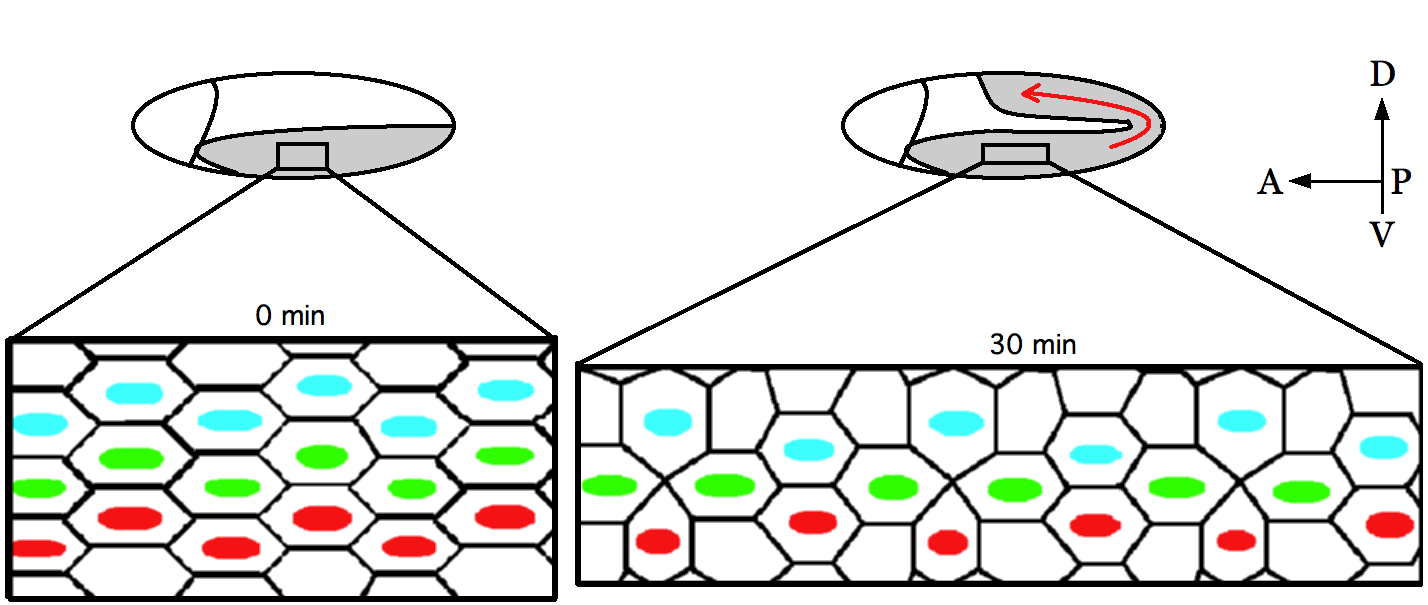
Schematic of Drosophila embryo at the start of germ-band elongation and 30 minutes later. The germ-band (grey) is posterior to the cephalic furrow (curved-line) and folds dorsally (red arrow) upon cell intercalation. Each rectangle represents a field of cells before (0 min) and after (30 min) convergent extension. Colored nuclei arbitrarily mark rows of cells in order to visualize tissue morphogenesis.

Germ-band extension is a morphogenic process widely studied in the development of Drosophila melanogaster in which the germ-band, which develops into the segmented trunk of the embryo, approximately doubles in length along the anterior-posterior axis while subsequently narrowing along the dorsal-ventral axis.

Germ-band extension begins shortly after gastrulation and is divided into two phases. The fast phase, in which most of the extension occurs, takes about 25 minutes. The remaining extension continues during the slow phase and is completed in the following 70 minutes. During this process the ventral germ-band extends around the posterior end of the embryo, effectively folding over onto the dorsal side of the egg. Multiple individual cells intercalating mediolateral to the anterior-posterior axis drive the resulting global elongation of the embryo. In addition, cell shape changes, and oriented cell divisions in the posterior germ-band are in part required for full elongation. However, elongation of the body axis seems to be primarily linked to changes in cell neighbor relations.

This article describes axis elongation in Drosophila. However, the basis of germ-band elongation is applicable to many organisms including other invertebrates and vertebrates alike.

== Cellular basis ==
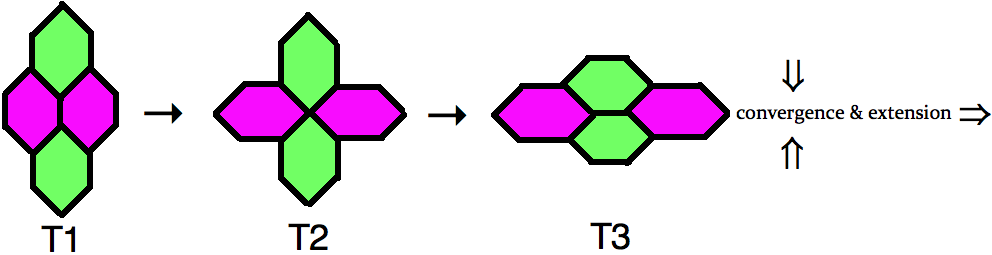
Schematic of neighbor exchange or an elementary T1 process involving four cells. T1-magenta cells are in direct contact. T2-all cells share a common vertex. T3-resolution results in green cells sharing a common boundary.

In order for cells to intercalate between one another the adherens junctions that maintain the integrity of the epithelial tissue must be dynamically remodeled. Time-lapse microscopy has captured this process of cell neighbor exchange, which is schematically represented to the right. In the type 1 configuration, two cells contact each other along the anterior-posterior axis, whereas two dorsal-ventral cells do not directly contact. Next, the cell boundary between the two anterior-posterior neighbors selectively shrinks, resulting in an obligatory intermediate type 2 junction, where the four cells share a vertex. Upon resolution of the type 2 junction, a new type 3 junction forms perpendicular to the original type 1 configuration. During this process the two dorsal-ventral cells have become neighbors. When multiple clusters of cells intercalate in the dorsal-ventral axis, through junctional neighbor exchange, the outcome is an extension of germ-band in the anterior-posterior axis.

In addition to the simple neighbor exchange, higher-ordered rosette formations have been observed in which five or more cells meet at a vertex. Multicellular rosettes form and resolve in a directional fashion that promotes germ-band elongation. Neighbor exchange and multicellular rosette formation involve oriented junctional remodeling, which indicates that the intercalating cells are intrinsically polarized within the plane of the epithelium.

== Molecular basis ==
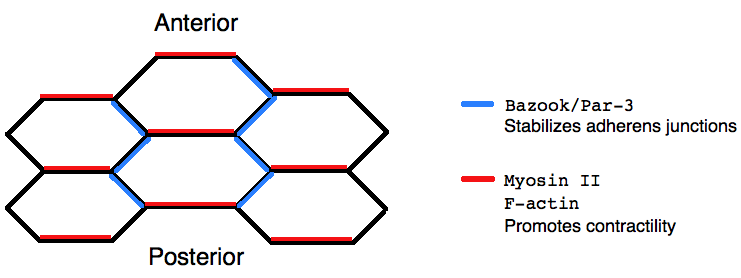
Asymmetric localization of proteins to reciprocal cell borders in the apical plane of a polarized epithelial.

The dorsal-ventral intercalation of cells during germ-band extension ultimately arises from the asymmetric localization of proteins within individual cells. Immunofluorescence reveals that non-muscle myosin II localizes to the anterior-posterior boundaries of cells, destabilizing adherens junctions, whereas the Bazooka/Par-3 complex localizes to dorsal-ventral boundaries, stabilizing adherens junctions. Moreover, bazooka mutants are defective in germ-band extension, which supports the idea that polarized protein localization is critical for cell rearrangements. One mechanism by which myosin II might promote polarized cell remodeling is through contractile activity that creates tension orienting junctional disassembly. However, the precise mechanism in which asymmetrically localized protein complexes encourage directed intercalation remains disputed.

The source that establishes planar polarity during germ-band extension remains elusive. Polarized intercalation is largely unaffected in mutant embryos that lack dorsal-ventral cell types. Yet, mutations that disrupt segmental patterning along the anterior-posterior axis, such as eve and runt, decrease cell intercalation and subsequent germ-band elongation. Furthermore, ectopic expression of eve or runt is sufficient to locally reorient the polarity of nearby cells. This evidence argues that planar polarity is established by cell-cell interactions, and not by a long-range polarizing cue. Thus, polarizing information can spread from one cell to the next, downstream of an Eve-dependent signal that remains to be identified.

== Tensile forces ==
Researchers suggest that mesoderm invagination provides an anterior-posterior pulling force that contributes to germ-band extension through passive cell shape changes. Although anterior-posterior patterning mutants fail to fully extend their germ-bands, during the fast phase the elongation length is normal despite defects in polarized cell intercalation. Time-lapse analysis revealed that an increase in cell shape stretching in the anterior-posterior axis was compensating for aberrant cell intercalation, independent of anterior-posterior patterning. Furthermore, during wild type development, it has been suggested that intercalary cell behavior relaxes the stress imposed on the germ-band, allowing stretched cells to restore to isometric shapes.

In addition, there is evidence that mechanical tension is necessary and sufficient for the cortical localization of myosin II. Thus, not only can myosin II generate tension but it may also be up-regulated by tensile forces, creating a positive feedback loop that allows cells to dynamically respond to fluctuations in their mechanical environment.
