= Engrailed =

Engrailed may refer to:

- engrailed (gene), a developmental gene in many animals
- Engrailed (moth), Ectropis crepuscularia, a moth
- Engrailed (heraldry), a term indicating curves pointing inwards (and points pointing outwards) in heraldry
- Engrailed arch, in architecture, an arch with cusps, as in a trefoil arch
