= ZNF160 =

Protein-coding gene in the species Homo sapiens

Identifiers
- Aliases: ZNF160, F11, HKr18, HZF5, KR18, zinc finger protein 160
- External IDs: OMIM: 600398; GeneCards: ZNF160

Gene location (Human)
Chr.	Chromosome 19 (human)
Band	19q13.41-q13.42	Start	53,066,606 bp
Band	19q13.41-q13.42	End	53,103,434 bp
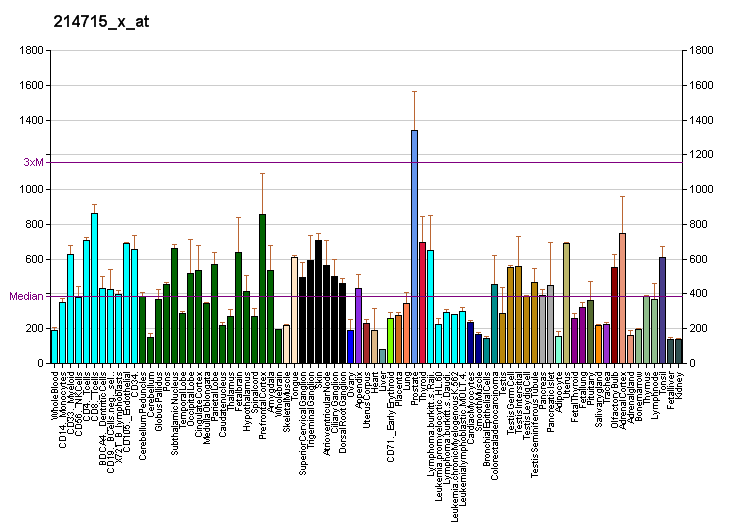
RNA expression pattern
Bgee	Human / Mouse (ortholog); Top expressed in: renal medulla; endothelial cell; pylorus; nipple; ventral tegmental area; visceral pleura; cardia; sperm; superior surface of tongue; trigeminal ganglion / n/a; More reference expression data
BioGPS	More reference expression data
Gene ontology
Molecular function	DNA binding; metal ion binding; nucleic acid binding; DNA-binding transcription factor activity, RNA polymerase II-specific
Cellular component	intracellular anatomical structure; nucleus
Biological process	regulation of transcription, DNA-templated; transcription, DNA-templated; regulation of transcription by RNA polymerase II; hemopoiesis
Sources:Amigo / QuickGO
Orthologs
Databases	NCBI: entry; OMA: entry
Species	Human	Mouse
Entrez	90338	n/a
Ensembl	ENSG00000170949	n/a
UniProt	Q9HCG1	n/a
RefSeq (mRNA)	NM_001102603; NM_033288; NM_198893; NM_001322125; NM_001322126 NM_001322128; NM_001322129; NM_001322130; NM_001322131; NM_001322132; NM_001322133; NM_001322134; NM_001322135; NM_001322136; NM_001322137; NM_001322138; NM_001322139	n/a
RefSeq (protein)	NP_001096073; NP_001309054; NP_001309055; NP_001309057; NP_001309058 NP_001309059; NP_001309060; NP_001309061; NP_001309062; NP_001309063; NP_001309064; NP_001309065; NP_001309066; NP_001309067; NP_001309068; NP_150630; NP_942596	n/a
Location (UCSC)	Chr 19: 53.07 – 53.1 Mb	n/a
PubMed search		n/a
- Wikidata
View/Edit Human

Zinc finger protein 160 is a protein that, in humans, is encoded by the ZNF160 gene.

The protein encoded by this gene is a Krüppel-related zinc finger protein which is characterized by the presence of an N-terminal repressor domain, the Kruppel-associated box (KRAB). The KRAB domain is a potent repressor of transcription; thus this protein may function in transcription regulation. Two alternative transcripts encoding the same isoform have been described.
