= ZNF274 =

Protein-coding gene in the species Homo sapiens

Identifiers
- Aliases: ZNF274, HFB101, ZF2, ZKSCAN19, ZSCAN51, zinc finger protein 274
- External IDs: OMIM: 605467; MGI: 2176229; GeneCards: ZNF274

Gene location (Human)
Chr.	Chromosome 19 (human)
Band	19q13.43	Start	58,183,029 bp
Band	19q13.43	End	58,213,562 bp

Gene location (Mouse)
Chr.	Chromosome 13 (mouse)
Band	13|13 B3	Start	65,426,628 bp
Band	13|13 B3	End	65,452,035 bp
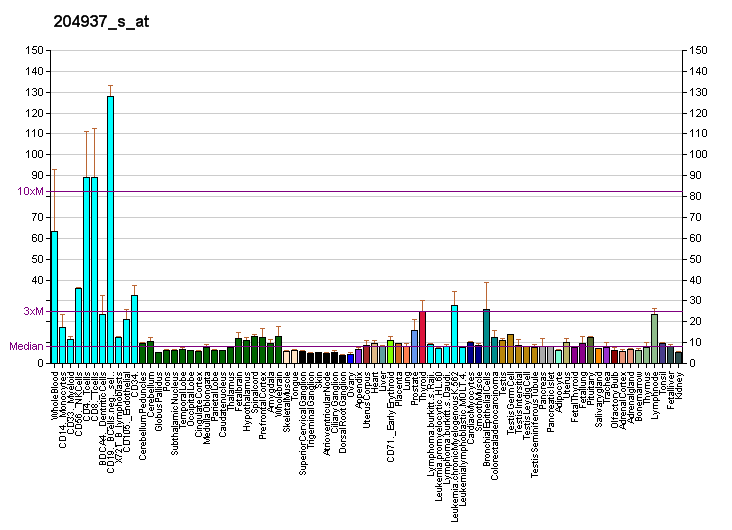
RNA expression pattern
Bgee	Human / Mouse (ortholog); Top expressed in: left ovary; epithelium of colon; left lobe of thyroid gland; right lobe of thyroid gland; right ovary; sural nerve; right ventricle; retinal pigment epithelium; left ventricle; right uterine tube / Top expressed in: genital tubercle; neural layer of retina; ventricular zone; retinal pigment epithelium; epiblast; tail of embryo; ciliary body; thymus; primitive streak; primary visual cortex; More reference expression data
BioGPS	More reference expression data
Gene ontology
Molecular function	DNA-binding transcription factor activity; sequence-specific DNA binding; DNA binding; protein binding; transcription corepressor activity; metal ion binding; nucleic acid binding; chromatin binding; DNA-binding transcription factor activity, RNA polymerase II-specific
Cellular component	cytoplasm; nucleolus; intracellular anatomical structure; nucleus
Biological process	regulation of transcription, DNA-templated; transcription, DNA-templated; regulation of histone H3-K9 trimethylation; negative regulation of nucleic acid-templated transcription; regulation of transcription by RNA polymerase II
Sources:Amigo / QuickGO
Orthologs
Databases	NCBI: entry; OMA: entry
Species	Human	Mouse
Entrez	10782	170936
Ensembl	ENSG00000171606	ENSMUSG00000021514
UniProt	Q96GC6	Q921B4
RefSeq (mRNA)	NM_001278734; NM_001278735; NM_016324; NM_016325; NM_133502	NM_178364
RefSeq (protein)	NP_001265663; NP_057408; NP_057409; NP_598009	n/a
Location (UCSC)	Chr 19: 58.18 – 58.21 Mb	Chr 13: 65.43 – 65.45 Mb
PubMed search
- Wikidata
View/Edit Human	View/Edit Mouse

Zinc finger protein 274 is a protein that in humans is encoded by the ZNF274 gene.

This gene encodes a zinc finger protein containing five C2H2-type zinc finger domains, one or two Kruppel-associated box A (KRAB A) domains, and a leucine-rich domain. The encoded protein has been suggested to be a transcriptional repressor. It localizes predominantly to the nucleolus. Alternatively spliced transcript variants encoding different isoforms exist. These variants utilize alternative polyadenylation signals.
