= Gooseberry (gene) =

Type of insect gene

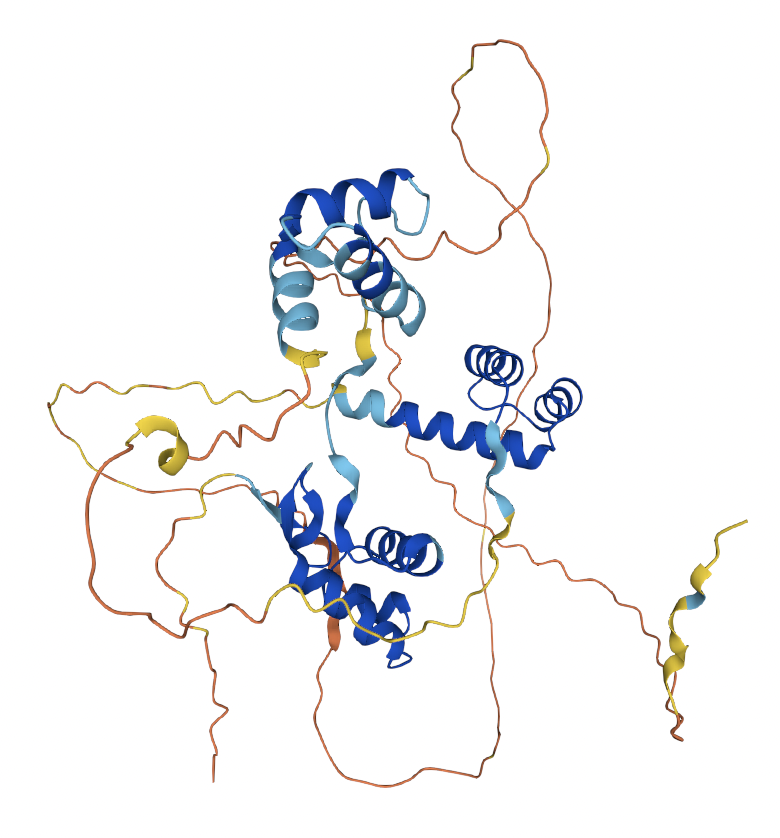
- Gooseberry protein 3D structure

Identifiers
- Organism: Drosophila melanogaster
- Symbol: gsb
- Alt. symbols: gsb-d, gooseberry-distal
- Entrez: 38005
- Orthologs: NCBI: entry; OMA: entry
- RefSeq (mRNA): NM_079139.4
- RefSeq (Prot): NP_523863.1
- UniProt: P09082

Other data
- Chromosome: 2R: 25.06 - 25.07 Mb
Search for
- Structures: Swiss-model
- Domains: InterPro

Gooseberry (gsb) is a segment polarity gene located on chromosome 2 of the Drosophila (fruit fly) genome. Gooseberry is known for its interactions with key embryonic signaling pathways Wingless and Hedgehog. The gene also has clinical significance, being linked to diseases such as Waardenburg Syndrome and rhabdomyosarcoma.

== Discovery ==
The gooseberry gene was first described in a 1980 research paper on Drosophila embryonic development. In the study, Drosophila larvae were mutated at different genomic locations to identify genes affecting Drosophila embryonic segmental patterning. 15 candidate genes were found to affect this developmental process, and were subsequently classified into 3 different categories: segment-polarity, pair-rule, and gap. Gooseberry, a member of these 15 genes, was classified as a segment-polarity gene.

== Gene expression ==
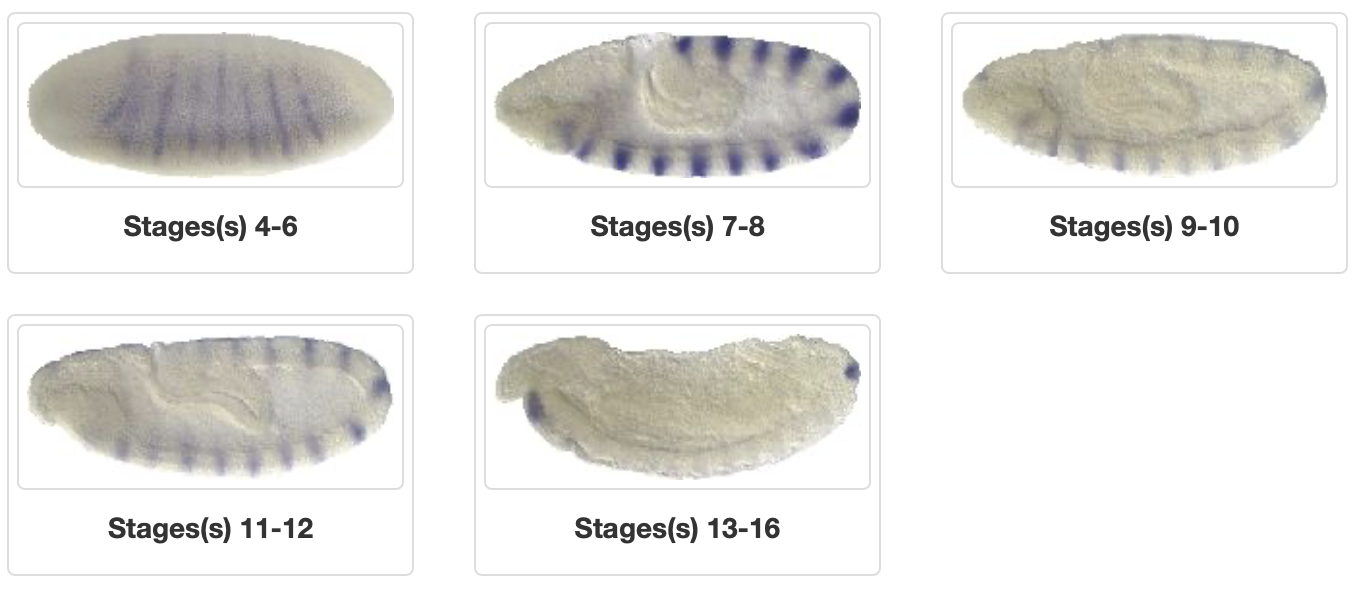
gsb gene embryonic expression images

Drosophila embryos show developmental stage-dependent expression of gsb. This was determined by in situ hybridization gsb mRNA with a purple probe, allowing visualization of the gene expression.

- Stages 1-3 exhibit no staining of gsb
- Stages 4-6 display segmentally repeated expression in various ectodermal (outermost layer of the embryo) regions.
- Stages 7-16 show independent and segmentally repeated expression in specific anatomical structures during different developmental stages. These structures include the ventral ectoderm, ventral epidermis, hypopharynx, and ventral nerve chord, which are all vital structures to embryonic development.

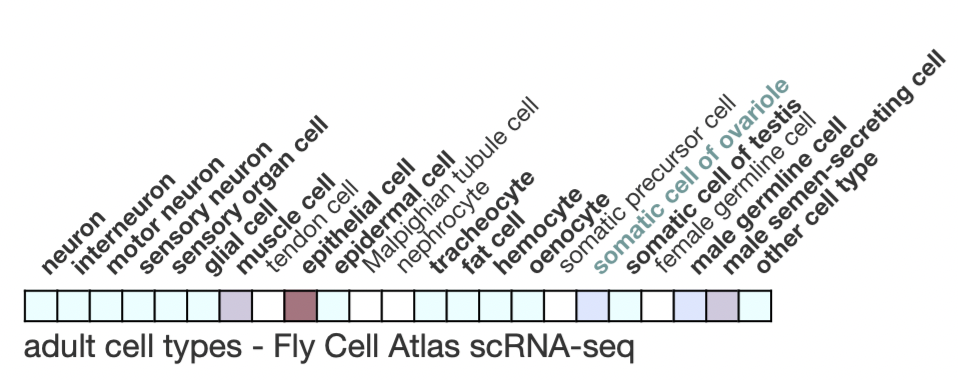
gsb gene expression profile in adult Drosophila - darker coloured boxes represent higher expression level.

The gsb expression profile of adult Drosophila shows the highest accumulation in epithelial cells. This is expected, as segment polarity genes such as gsb are required for proper epidermal segment patterning, and the epithelium gives rise to the epidermis during fruit fly embryonic development.

== Structure ==
Gooseberry contains an N-terminal PAX (paired box) and C-terminal homeobox domains.

== Function ==
The Gooseberry protein interacts with critical development pathways in the fruit fly such as Wingless and Hedgehog.

=== Wingless signaling ===
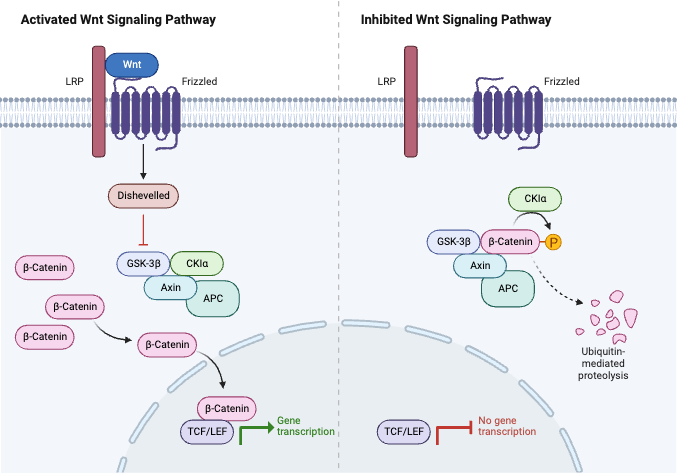
Wnt signalling pathway

The Drosophila cell fate determination pathway Wingless signaling (Wg), is activated by the signaling molecule Wnt, which inhibits the Wg destruction complex (WSDC). WSDC functions to break down β-catenin, a protein that binds to promoters of cell fate determination genes to promote expression.

In the absence of Wnt, Wg fails to activate, allowing WSDC to break down β-catenin, and preventing activation of genes.

Typical gooseberry expression in Drosophila embryos requires Wg activation. This implies that gooseberry is one of the cell fate determination genes promoted by β-catenin, and that its protein production is reliant on Wg for WSDC inhibition.

=== Hedgehog signaling ===
Hedgehog is a cell signalling pathway which directs cell development and tissue organization of developing Drosophila embryos.

During Drosophila central nervous system (CNS) development, Hedgehog and gooseberry assert differential regulatory effects on a key CNS development gene. This gene, huckebein (hkb), encodes a critical DNA-binding protein (Hkb) which influences developmental processes such as axon pathfinding and target recognition. Hedgehog activates hkb, while gooseberry represses hkb. Gooseberry achieves this by encoding a DNA-binding protein (a PAX-type transcription factor) which regulates gene activity and, in hkb's case, prevents activation.

The delicate interplay of positive signaling from Hedgehog and the repressive gooseberry helps establish a precise pattern of hkb expression in the developing fruit fly CNS, helping form complex neural structures.

== Clinical significance ==
Drosophila' s gooseberry gene has been used to study the vertebrate genes PAX3 and PAX7 in clinical settings. This is attributed to the gooseberry genes gsb-proximal and gsb-distal showing similar function to PAX3 and PAX7.

=== Waardenburg syndrome ===
Waardenburg Syndrome (WS) is an inherited condition known to cause deafeness and pigmentation irregularities. PAX3 variants are linked to type I & III WS, likely due to the gene's important role in the development of melanocytes. Studies have shown that many WS-causing PAX3 polymorphisms are found in a protein region that is conserved in the gsb protein. In Drosophila, this region is classified as a DNA-binding site called a homeodomain. Considering this knowledge, it is believed that the mechanism underlying WS phenotypes involves altered DNA binding in PAX3 variants. Elucidation of this link between PAX3 and gooseberry have directed the molecular study of PAX3-associated phenotypes including emphasis on DNA binding studies.

=== Rhabdomyosarcoma ===
Rhabdomyosarcoma is a rapidly progressing soft tissue cancer that disproportionately affects children. PAX7 is a paired-box transcription factor involved in skeletal muscle formation/cellular role differentiation in mammals. Increased PAX7 levels have been repeatedly implicated in cases of rhabdomyosarcoma, particularly embryonal rhabdomyosarcoma.

Because of PAX7's homology with gooseberry, research has been able to exploit Drosophila models to study rhabdomyosarcoma. Transgenic fruit flies, whose genomes have been altered via genetic engineering, were studied and have implicated the known proliferation pathway Ras in the disease. Additionally, PAX7 and gooseberry have been found to show similar segmented expression during neural development, suggesting links to rhabdomyosarcoma metastasis into the CNS.
