= Hunchback (gene) =

Maternal effect gene and gap gene

Identifiers
- Organism: Drosophila melanogaster
- Symbol: hb
- Orthologs: OMA: entry
- UniProt: P05084
Search for
- Structures: Swiss-model
- Domains: InterPro

Hunchback is a maternal effect and zygotic gene expressed in the embryos of the fruit fly Drosophila melanogaster. In maternal effect genes, the RNA or protein from the mother's gene is deposited into the oocyte or embryo before the embryo can express its own zygotic genes.

Hunchback is a morphogen, meaning the concentration gradient of Hunchback at a specific region determines the segment or body part it develops into. This is possible because Hunchback is a transcription factor protein that binds to genes' regulatory regions, changing RNA expression levels.

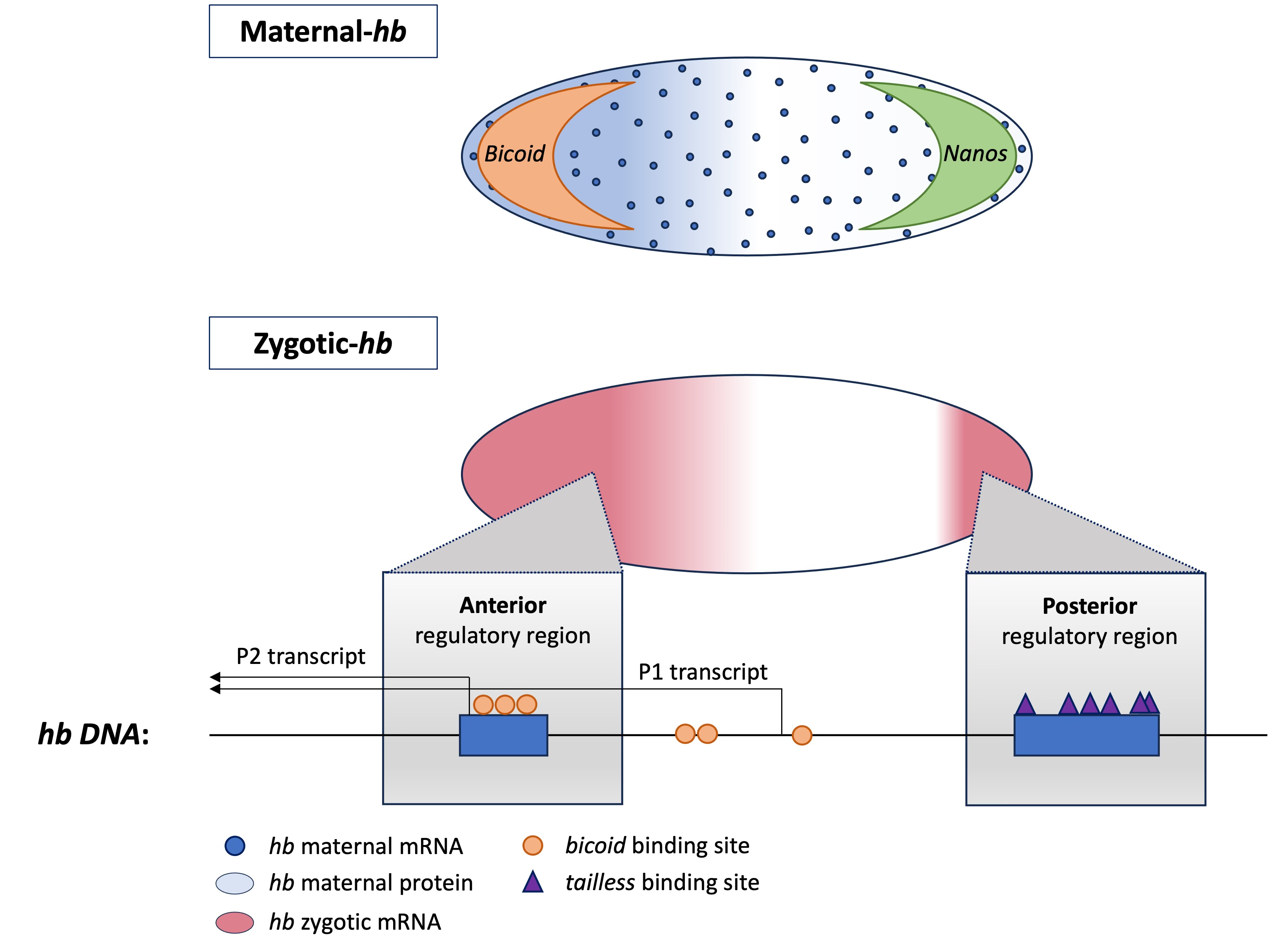
Maternal (Top) and zygotic (Bottom) hunchback (hb) patterning and regulation.

== Hunchback expression pathway ==
Maternal Hunchback RNA enters the embryo at the syncytial blastoderm stage, where the entire embryo has undergone many nuclear divisions but has one communal cytoplasm, allowing for RNA to disperse freely throughout the embryo. This allows the maternal effect genes Hunchback, Bicoid, Nanos, and Caudal to regulate zygotic genes to create different identities for different regions of the body.

The first step is establishing the anterior and posterior regions, which later give rise to the respective head and abdomen. In the syncytial blastoderm, Bicoid and Nanos RNA bind to protein ropes involved in cellular locomotion and intracellular transport called microtubules that ferry the RNA to the anterior and posterior regions, respectively. Hunchback does not bind to microtubules and therefore diffuses uniformly throughout the embryo. However, Nanos represses the translation of the Hunchback protein. Since Nanos is ferried to the posterior pole, maternal Hunchback is expressed predominantly in the anterior pole.

Hunchback is also expressed zygotically in the farmost anterior and posterior poles of the syncytial blastoderm. Anterior zygotic Hunchback expression is controlled by enhancers, regions of DNA that increase gene expression when transcription factors are bound. One enhancer is close to Hunchback, and a recently discovered enhancer is farther away. When Bicoid binds to these enhancers, the expression of Hunchback increases proportionally to the Bicoid concentration in the anterior pole. A separate regulatory region downstream of the Hunchback enhancers governs the posterior expression of zygotic Hunchback. Here, Hunchback expression is proportional to the concentration of Tailless and Huckebein proteins available to bind to the regulatory region.

== Effects of Hunchback expression ==
As a bifunctional transcription factor, Hunchback both activates and represses its target segmentation genes, and in doing so, regulates the anterior and posterior embryonic segmentation in the Drosophila embryo. For example, anterior Hunchback expression is known to establish the region that later develops into the thoracic and jaw- and mouth-related segments, and posterior Hunchback expression for the development of abdominal segments.

Hunchback's morphogenetic gradient regulates the expression of other gap genes, Krüppel and Knirps, wherein maternal Hunchback expression defines the anterior Knirps and posterior Krüppel borders, while zygotic Hunchback expression establishes the anterior Knirps border.

Hunchback also establishes the expression pattern of pair-rule genes, such as even-skipped, expressed later in development to define distinct segments along the anterior-posterior axis. Pair-rule genes then encode transcription factors that regulate segment polarity genes: the final, most specified group of proteins that coordinate segmentation.

== Clinical significance ==
The Hunchback gene has a known human ortholog that evolved from a common ancestor, the Pegasus gene (Ikzf5) of the Ikaros family zinc finger group. Ikaros family genes encode transcription factors that have implications in thrombocytopenia, a blood clotting deficiency, acute myeloid leukemia, a blood and bone marrow cancer, and are involved in mammalian retinal and immune system development. Ikaros family genes have also been implicated as an indicator for chronic graft-versus-host disease, a condition where immune cells attack transplanted tissue.

== See also ==
- Drosophila embryogenesis
- Drosophila melanogaster
- Maternal effect
- Gap gene
