= Krüppel =

Identifiers
- Organism: Drosophila melanogaster
- Symbol: kr
- UniProt: P07247
Search for
- Structures: Swiss-model
- Domains: InterPro

Krüppel homolog 1

Identifiers
- Organism: Drosophila melanogaster
- Symbol: kr-h1
- UniProt: P08155
Search for
- Structures: Swiss-model
- Domains: InterPro

Krüppel homolog 2

Identifiers
- Organism: Drosophila melanogaster
- Symbol: kr-h2
- UniProt: Q9V447
Search for
- Structures: Swiss-model
- Domains: InterPro

Krüppel-like factor luna

Identifiers
- Organism: Drosophila melanogaster
- Symbol: luna
- UniProt: Q8MR37
Search for
- Structures: Swiss-model
- Domains: InterPro

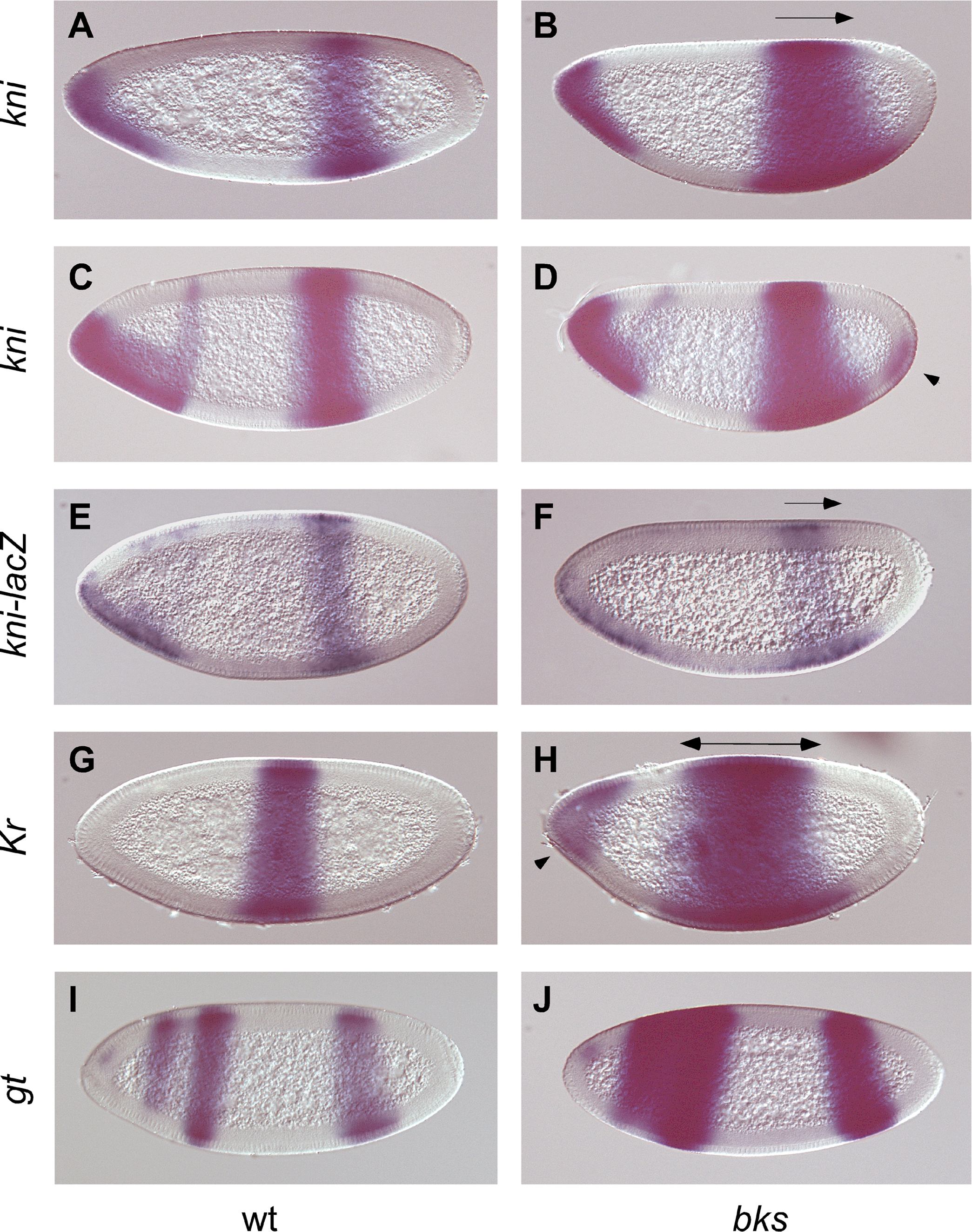
In situ hybridization against mRNA of the gap genes knirps, Krüppel and giant in the Drosophila melanogaster early embryo. Panels also show how these genes are affected by the mutation brakeless (bks).

Krüppel is a gap gene in Drosophila melanogaster, located on the 2R chromosome, which encodes a zinc finger C2H2 transcription factor. Gap genes work together to establish the anterior-posterior segment patterning of the insect through regulation of the transcription factor encoding pair rule genes. These genes in turn regulate segment polarity genes. Krüppel means "cripple" in German, named for the crippled appearance of mutant larvae, who have failed to develop proper thoracic and anterior segments in the abdominal region. Mutants can also have abdominal mirror duplications.

Human homologs of Krüppel are collectively named Krüppel-like factors, a set of proteins well characterized for their role in carcinogenesis.

== Krüppel expression pathway ==
Krüppel is expressed in the center of the embryo during the cellular blastoderm stage of development. Its expression pattern is restricted to this domain largely through interactions with the maternal effect genes Bicoid and Nanos, and fellow gap gene Hunchback and Knirps.

Bicoid maternal transcripts are deposited at the anterior end of the embryo, while Nanos maternal transcripts are located at the posterior. Hunchback mRNA transcripts are present throughout the embryo. Bicoid and Nanos both encode morphogens that have the opposite effect on Hunchback mRNA translation – Bicoid activates translation, whereas Nanos represses it. As such, Hunchback mRNA is translated so that Hunchback protein is present in the concentration gradient which decreases along the anterior – posterior axis. This Hunchback gradient indirectly results in an anterior boundary for Knirps expression. Other factors induce a posterior boundary, so that Knirps is expressed in a stripe in the posterior region of the embryo.

Hunchback and Knirps are both transcription factors that regulate Krüppel expression. High levels of Hunchback inhibit expression, whereas low levels of Hunchback activate expression. Knirps acts as a repressor to inhibit expression. This results in Krüppel being expressed in a stripe in the center of the embryo's A-P axis, where Hunchback concentration has dropped to a low enough level so that it can act as an activator, but Knirps is not yet present to inhibit. In this way the initial gradients of morphogens can lead to the establishment of a specific region within the blastoderm. It can be compared to a narrow bandwidth filter in engineering.

== Effects of Krüppel expression ==
The Krüppel protein is a transcription factor, and has been shown to act as a repressor. It functions in collaboration with other gap genes and their localized protein products to regulate the expression of the primary pair rule genes – even skipped (eve), hairy (h), and runt. It has been postulated that Krüppel inhibits eve expression to create the posterior boundary of eve stripe two, and evidence has also been found for Krüppel being a player specifically in the formation of hairy stripe 7. The expression patterns of pair rule gene will in turn regulate the segment polarity genes, making Krüppel essential for proper development along the anterior posterior axis and segment identity.

== Clinical significance ==
Krüppel has shown homology to the mammalian Krüppel-like factors, which play key biological roles in the pathogenesis of many human diseases: cancer, obesity, inflammatory disorders and cardiovascular complications. Moreover, KLFs are known to be involved in inducible pluripotent stem cells generation, and preservation of the pluripotent state of embryonic stem cells.

== See also ==
- Drosophila melanogaster
- Drosophila embryogenesis
- Maternal effect
