= WNT1 =

Protein-coding gene in animals

Identifiers
- Aliases: WNT1, BMND16, INT1, OI15, Wnt family member 1
- External IDs: OMIM: 164820; MGI: 98953; GeneCards: WNT1

Gene location (Human)
Chr.	Chromosome 12 (human)
Band	12q13.12	Start	48,978,322 bp
Band	12q13.12	End	48,982,620 bp

Gene location (Mouse)
Chr.	Chromosome 15 (mouse)
Band	15 F1|15 54.65 cM	Start	98,687,738 bp
Band	15 F1|15 54.65 cM	End	98,691,718 bp
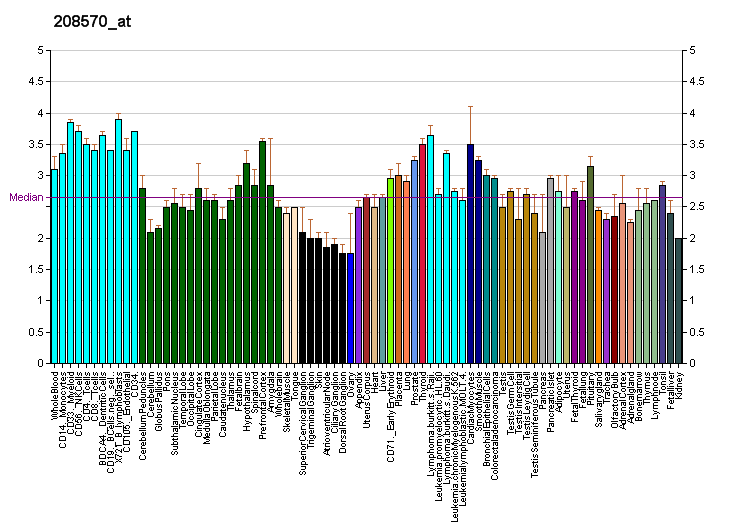
RNA expression pattern
Bgee	Human / Mouse (ortholog); Top expressed in: granulocyte; nucleus accumbens; superior frontal gyrus; right frontal lobe; prefrontal cortex; putamen; blood; caudate nucleus; bone marrow; Brodmann area 9 / Top expressed in: muscle layer of urethra; pelvic part of vagina; rhombic lip; ejaculatory duct; perineal part of vagina; inner cell mass; epithelium of seminiferous tubule of testis; choroid plexus of fourth ventricle; female urethra; morula; More reference expression data
BioGPS	More reference expression data
Gene ontology
Molecular function	cytokine activity; protein domain specific binding; frizzled binding; morphogen activity; signaling receptor binding; receptor ligand activity
Cellular component	cytoplasm; endocytic vesicle membrane; endoplasmic reticulum lumen; plasma membrane; extracellular region; cell surface; Golgi lumen; extracellular exosome; extracellular space
Biological process	negative regulation of cell-substrate adhesion; forebrain anterior/posterior pattern specification; dopaminergic neuron differentiation; neurogenesis; cell fate commitment; negative regulation of fat cell differentiation; positive regulation of protein phosphorylation; myotube differentiation; metencephalon development; midbrain-hindbrain boundary maturation during brain development; T cell differentiation in thymus; spinal cord association neuron differentiation; negative regulation of cell-cell adhesion; neuron fate determination; signal transduction in response to DNA damage; central nervous system morphogenesis; positive regulation of fibroblast proliferation; positive regulation of dermatome development; cell-cell signaling; negative regulation of cell differentiation; hematopoietic stem cell proliferation; cell proliferation in midbrain; positive regulation of DNA-binding transcription factor activity; embryonic axis specification; hepatocyte differentiation; negative regulation of transforming growth factor beta receptor signaling pathway; cerebellum development; ubiquitin-dependent SMAD protein catabolic process; cerebellum formation; negative regulation of BMP signaling pathway; canonical Wnt signaling pathway involved in negative regulation of apoptotic process; positive regulation of transcription, DNA-templated; multicellular organism development; diencephalon development; branching involved in ureteric bud morphogenesis; cellular response to peptide hormone stimulus; midbrain-hindbrain boundary development; embryonic brain development; response to wounding; positive regulation of insulin-like growth factor receptor signaling pathway; inner ear morphogenesis; animal organ regeneration; positive regulation of cell population proliferation; negative regulation of ubiquitin-dependent protein catabolic process; neuron fate commitment; myoblast fusion; positive regulation of lamellipodium assembly; bone development; Spemann organizer formation; midbrain development; positive regulation of Notch signaling pathway; positive regulation of transcription by RNA polymerase II; Wnt signaling pathway; astrocyte-dopaminergic neuron signaling; positive regulation of canonical Wnt signaling pathway; Wnt signaling pathway involved in midbrain dopaminergic neuron differentiation; midbrain dopaminergic neuron differentiation; canonical Wnt signaling pathway involved in midbrain dopaminergic neuron differentiation; Wnt signaling pathway, planar cell polarity pathway; beta-catenin destruction complex disassembly; negative regulation of oxidative stress-induced neuron death; regulation of signaling receptor activity; canonical Wnt signaling pathway; negative regulation of apoptotic process; neuron differentiation
Sources:Amigo / QuickGO
Orthologs
Databases	NCBI: entry; OMA: entry
Species	Human	Mouse
Entrez	7471	22408
Ensembl	ENSG00000125084	ENSMUSG00000022997
UniProt	P04628	P04426
RefSeq (mRNA)	NM_005430	NM_021279
RefSeq (protein)	NP_005421	NP_067254
Location (UCSC)	Chr 12: 48.98 – 48.98 Mb	Chr 15: 98.69 – 98.69 Mb
PubMed search
- Wikidata
View/Edit Human	View/Edit Mouse

WNT1 is a gene that encodes the WNT1 protein. It is a proto-oncogene involved in regulating embryonic development and is highly conserved among animals. WNT1 was previously known as INT1 in mammals and Wg (or "wingless") in Drosophila. In 1987, it was discovered that they were the same gene (i.e. they were homologous), and the gene was subsequently renamed WNT1 as a portmanteau of wingless and int-1.

The WNT gene family consists of structurally related genes that encode secreted signaling proteins. These proteins have been implicated in oncogenesis and in several developmental processes, including regulation of cell fate and patterning during embryogenesis. This gene is a member of the WNT gene family. It is very conserved in evolution, and the protein encoded by this gene is known to be 98% identical to the mouse Wnt1 protein at the amino acid level. The studies in mouse indicate that the Wnt1 protein functions in the induction of the mesencephalon and cerebellum.

== Gene ==
This gene is clustered with another family member, WNT10B, in the chromosome 12q13 region.

== Structure ==
The WNT1 protein is a secreted glycoprotein, typically composed of approximately 343 amino acids after cleavage of a precursor peptide. It belongs to the Wnt family, which is characterized by several unique structural features. WNT1 displays a highly conserved primary structure, notably containing 22–24 conserved cysteine residues critical for multiple intramolecular disulfide bonds that stabilize a complex, folded conformation.

Wnt proteins exhibit a two-domain organization: an N-terminal domain rich in alpha-helices stabilized by disulfide bridges, and a C-terminal domain dominated by beta-sheets, also supported by disulfide bonds. This overall folding pattern is unique among known protein structures. The protein is highly hydrophobic, a property related to post-translational lipid modifications, particularly palmitoleic acid addition at conserved serine residues, which is essential for functional interaction with Frizzled family receptors. WNT1 has a globular configuration with distinct "thumb" and "index finger" regions that engage specific receptor domains, facilitating canonical and non-canonical Wnt signaling. The mature WNT1 protein is glycosylated and forms complexes with Frizzled receptors, initiating developmental and oncogenic signaling cascades.

== Function ==
WNT1 is a secreted glycoprotein that plays an important role in regulating embryonic development and adult tissue homeostasis, primarily through its function as a morphogen and signaling molecule. As a canonical Wnt ligand, WNT1 activates the Wnt/β-catenin pathway by binding to Frizzled and LRP5/LRP6 receptors, leading to the stabilization and nuclear translocation of beta-catenin. This activation facilitates the transcription of genes crucial for cell proliferation, survival, differentiation, and migration. In development, WNT1 is essential for proper patterning and proliferation of neural progenitor cells, particularly influencing midbrain and hindbrain formation, neural crest cell expansion, and dopaminergic neuron development. In adult tissues, WNT1-mediated signaling contributes to stem cell maintenance and tissue repair.

Aberrant WNT1 activation is strongly implicated in oncogenesis. Elevated WNT1 signaling can disrupt normal cell adhesion, promote uncontrolled proliferation, and contribute to tumor initiation and progression by upregulating oncogenic targets such as c-Myc and cyclin D1. It also influences tumor immune evasion and metastasis in several cancer types, making WNT1 a significant target for potential cancer therapeutics.

== Clinical significance ==
The WNT1 gene has notable clinical significance due to its role in both inherited bone disorders and cancer biology. Pathogenic variants in WNT1 are recognized as a cause of osteogenesis imperfecta (OI) and early-onset osteoporosis (EOOP), with homozygous mutations typically leading to severe, life-threatening bone fragility, while heterozygous mutations can result in milder phenotypes such as reduced bone mass or early fractures without significant deformity. WNT1 is crucial for normal skeletal development and bone homeostasis, and impairment of its function disrupts osteoblastogenesis via the Wnt/β-Catenin signaling pathway, leading to compromised bone strength. In oncology, overexpression of WNT1 has been identified in non-small cell lung cancer (NSCLC) and correlates with increased tumor proliferation, angiogenesis, and a poorer prognosis. Its status has been shown to serve as a significant independent prognostic factor in NSCLC, likely through the upregulation of proliferation-related target genes such as c-Myc.

== History ==
The WNT1 gene name derives its name from the fusion of two earlier gene discoveries: wingless (wg) in Drosophila melanogaster and int-1 in mice. The wingless gene, identified through mutagenesis screens in the 1970s, was found to be critical for segment polarity in fly embryos, a discovery that contributed to the 1995 Nobel Prize in Physiology or Medicine to Edward B. Lewis, Christiane Nüsslein-Volhard and Eric F. Wieschaus. Independently, int-1 was discovered as a common integration site for mouse mammary tumor virus (MMTV) and shown to induce tumors, work that was part of the oncogene research recognized by the 1989 Nobel Prize to J. Michael Bishop and Harold E. Varmus.

Later, int-1 was found to be the mammalian ortholog of wingless, linking developmental biology and cancer research. To unify and standardize the growing list of orthologs and paralogs, scientists proposed the name Wnt as a portmanteau of wingless and int-1—with Wnt1 becoming the founding member of this conserved gene family.

== See also ==
- Wnt signaling pathway
