= EN2 (gene) =

Protein-coding gene in the species Homo sapiens

Identifiers
- Aliases: EN2, engrailed homeobox 2
- External IDs: OMIM: 131310; MGI: 95390; GeneCards: EN2

Gene location (Human)
Chr.	Chromosome 7 (human)
Band	7q36.3	Start	155,458,129 bp
Band	7q36.3	End	155,464,831 bp

Gene location (Mouse)
Chr.	Chromosome 5 (mouse)
Band	5 B1|5 13.94 cM	Start	28,370,692 bp
Band	5 B1|5 13.94 cM	End	28,377,164 bp
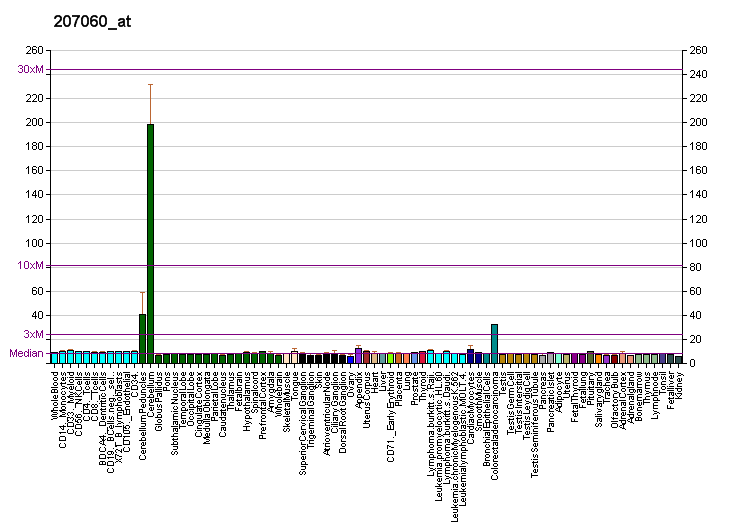
RNA expression pattern
Bgee	Human / Mouse (ortholog); Top expressed in: cerebellar cortex; cerebellar hemisphere; right hemisphere of cerebellum; cerebellar vermis; paraflocculus of cerebellum; muscle of thigh; substantia nigra; endometrium; gastrocnemius muscle; left ovary / Top expressed in: lobe of cerebellum; cerebellar vermis; pineal gland; rhombic lip; substantia nigra; choroid plexus of fourth ventricle; inferior colliculi; lumbar subsegment of spinal cord; molecular layer of cerebellar cortex; central gray substance of midbrain; More reference expression data
BioGPS	More reference expression data
Gene ontology
Molecular function	sequence-specific DNA binding; DNA binding; DNA-binding transcription factor activity, RNA polymerase II-specific
Cellular component	membrane; nucleus; fibrillar center; nucleolus; RSC-type complex
Biological process	negative regulation of neuron apoptotic process; multicellular organism development; hindbrain development; neuron development; embryonic brain development; regulation of transcription, DNA-templated; midbrain development; positive regulation of transcription by RNA polymerase II; neuron differentiation; regulation of transcription by RNA polymerase II
Sources:Amigo / QuickGO
Orthologs
Databases	NCBI: entry; OMA: entry
Species	Human	Mouse
Entrez	2020	13799
Ensembl	ENSG00000164778	ENSMUSG00000039095
UniProt	P19622	P09066
RefSeq (mRNA)	NM_001427	NM_010134; NM_001395060
RefSeq (protein)	NP_001418	NP_034264; NP_001381989
Location (UCSC)	Chr 7: 155.46 – 155.46 Mb	Chr 5: 28.37 – 28.38 Mb
PubMed search
- Wikidata
View/Edit Human	View/Edit Mouse

Homeobox protein engrailed-2 is a protein that in humans is encoded by the EN2 gene. It is a member of the engrailed gene family.

== Function ==
Homeobox-containing genes are thought to have a role in controlling development. In Drosophila, the 'engrailed' (en) gene plays an important role during development in segmentation, where it is required for the formation of posterior compartments. Different mutations in the mouse homologs, En1 and En2, produced different developmental defects that frequently are lethal. The human engrailed homologs 1 and 2 encode homeodomain-containing proteins and have been implicated in the control of pattern formation during development of the central nervous system.

== Description ==
The Engrailed-2 gene encodes for the Engrailed-2 homeobox transcription factor. The signaling molecule, fibroblast growth factor 8 (FGF8), controls the expression of the En2 gene. The isthmus organizer expresses varying concentrations of FGF8 that influence the En2 transcription factor. En2 transcription factor is involved in patterning the midbrain of the central nervous system during embryonic development. Specifically, it is required for proper positioning of folia in the developing hemispheres. It continues to regulate foliation throughout nervous system development. En2 patterns cerebellum foliation in the mediolateral axis. Several birth defects can arise from inadequate or abnormal En2 expression. Scientists use a mice model to study the effects of En2 knockout alleles on development. When the En2 gene is knocked out, vermis foliation patterning becomes extremely altered. Along with decreased cerebellum foliation complexity, mutations in the En2 gene result in a depleted vermis or an overly simplified foliation pattern. The Engrailed genes are essential to proper neural circuit development.

== In cancer diagnosis ==
A method for diagnosing prostate cancer by detection of EN2 in urine has been developed. The results of a clinical trial of 288 men suggest that EN2 could be a marker for prostate cancer which might prove more reliable than current methods that use prostate-specific antigen (PSA). If effective, a urine test is considered easier and less embarrassing for the patient than blood tests or rectal examinations and, therefore, less likely to discourage early diagnosis. At the time of the report, it was not clear whether or not the EN2 test could distinguish between aggressive tumours that would require intervention and relatively benign ones that would not.

=== Licensing and marketing ===
The EN2 test for prostate cancer has been licensed to Zeus Scientific, as they reported in March 2013. In that announcement they said they expected the test to be submitted to the US-FDA in a year, and available worldwide in 2 years.

=== Negative results ===
However, an independent study published in 2020 questioned the value of EN2 as a urinary marker for prostate cancer. In a comparison between 90 PC patients and 30 healthy subjects, their results show that EN2 as a PC biomarker brings no additional value to the current use of PSA in clinical practice. Despite their announcement of new clinical trial in 2018, the developers of the urinary EN2 test at the University of Surrey never registered such a trial at ClinicalTrials.gov or published any results of it. Also, Randox Ltd, the diagnostic company which was to commercialize the urinary EN2, does not offer it any more in their product portfolio.
