= Bicoid 3′-UTR regulatory element =

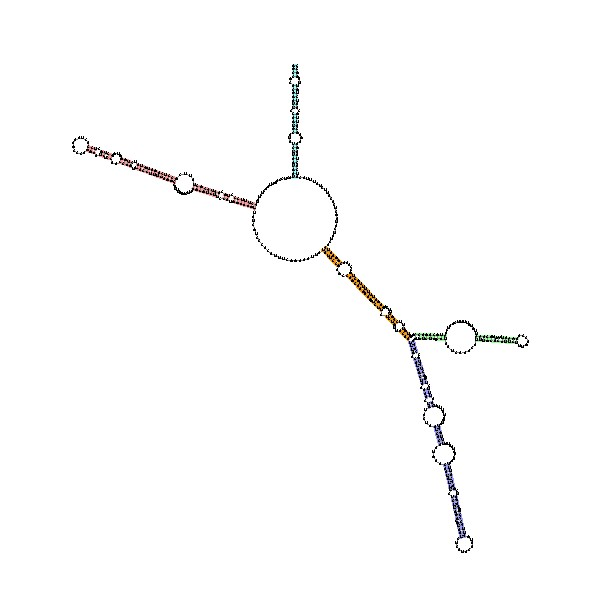
- Stem-loop structure of the bicoid 3′-UTR regulatory element

Identifiers
- Symbol: bcd
- Rfam: RF00551

Other data
- RNA type: Cis-reg
- Domain(s): Insecta
- PDB structures: PDBe

The bicoid 3′-UTR regulatory element is an mRNA regulatory element that controls the gene expression of the bicoid protein in fruitfly Drosophila melanogaster.

The structured RNA element consists of four domains (denoted as II, III, IV and V) in the 3′UTR of the mRNA. It is essential for the correct transport and localisation of bicoid mRNA during oocyte and embryo differentiation, which has been studied most thoroughly in the development of Drosophila melanogaster (fruitfly) larvae.
