= Segmentation (biology) =

Division of some animal and plant body plans into a series of segments

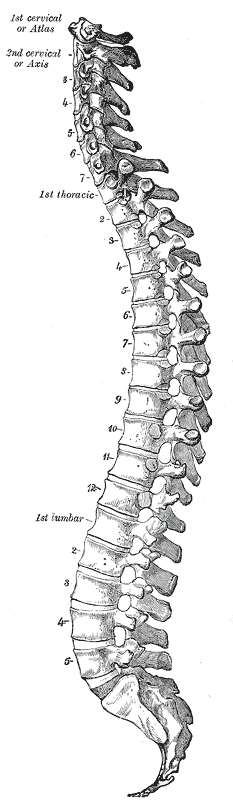
Vertebrates have a segmented vertebral column.

Segmentation in biology is the division of some animal and plant body plans into a linear series of repetitive segments that may or may not be interconnected to each other. This article focuses on the segmentation of animal body plans, specifically using the examples of the taxa Arthropoda, Chordata, and Annelida. These three groups form segments by using a "growth zone" to direct and define the segments. While all three have a generally segmented body plan and use a growth zone, they use different mechanisms for generating this patterning. Even within these groups, different organisms have different mechanisms for segmenting the body. Segmentation of the body plan is important for allowing free movement and development of certain body parts. It also allows for regeneration in specific individuals.

== Definition ==
Segmentation is a difficult process to satisfactorily define. Many taxa (for example the molluscs) have some form of serial repetition in their units but are not conventionally thought of as segmented. Segmented animals are those considered to have organs that were repeated, or to have a body composed of self-similar units, but usually it is the parts of an organism that are referred to as being segmented.

== Embryology ==
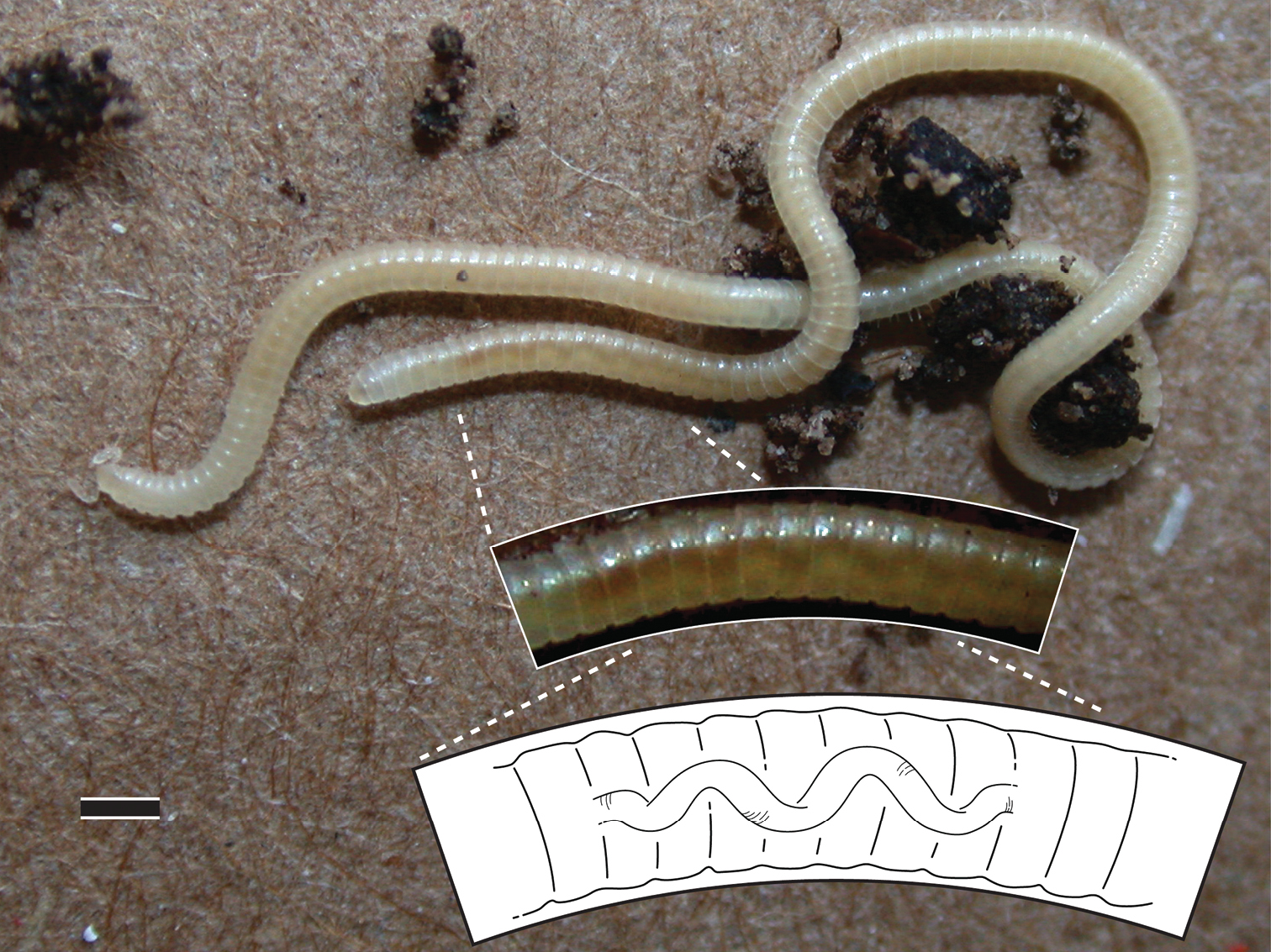
Illacme plenipes, a millipede with 170 segments and 662 legs

Segmentation in animals typically falls into three types, characteristic of different arthropods, vertebrates, and annelids. Arthropods such as the fruit fly form segments from a field of equivalent cells based on transcription factor gradients. Vertebrates like the zebrafish use oscillating gene expression to define segments known as somites. Annelids such as the leech use smaller blast cells budded off from large teloblast cells to define segments.

=== Arthropods ===
Expression of Hox genes in the body segments of different groups of arthropod, as traced by evolutionary developmental biology. The Hox genes 7, 8, and 9 correspond in these groups but are shifted (by heterochrony) by up to three segments. Segments with maxillipeds have Hox gene 7. Fossil trilobites probably had three body regions, each with a unique combination of Hox genes.

Although Drosophila segmentation is not representative of the arthropod phylum in general, it is the most highly studied. Early screens to identify genes involved in cuticle development led to the discovery of a class of genes that was necessary for proper segmentation of the Drosophila embryo.

To properly segment the Drosophila embryo, the anterior-posterior axis is defined by maternally supplied transcripts giving rise to gradients of these proteins. This gradient then defines the expression pattern for gap genes, which set up the boundaries between the different segments. The gradients produced from gap gene expression then define the expression pattern for the pair-rule genes. The pair-rule genes are mostly transcription factors, expressed in regular stripes down the length of the embryo. These transcription factors then regulate the expression of segment polarity genes, which define the polarity of each segment. Boundaries and identities of each segment are later defined.

Within the arthropods, the body wall, nervous system, kidneys, muscles and body cavity are segmented, as are the appendages (when they are present). Some of these elements (e.g. musculature) are not segmented in their sister taxon, the onychophora.

=== Annelids: Leech ===
While not as well studied as in Drosophila and zebrafish, segmentation in the leech has been described as “budding” segmentation. Early divisions within the leech embryo result in teloblast cells, which are stem cells that divide asymmetrically to create bandlets of blast cells. Furthermore, there are five different teloblast lineages (N, M, O, P, and Q), with one set for each side of the midline. The N and Q lineages contribute two blast cells for each segment, while the M, O, and P lineages only contribute one cell per segment. Finally, the number of segments within the embryo is defined by the number of divisions and blast cells. Segmentation appears to be regulated by the gene Hedgehog, suggesting its common evolutionary origin in the ancestor of arthropods and annelids.

Within the annelids, as with the arthropods, the body wall, nervous system, kidneys, muscles and body cavity are generally segmented. However, this is not true for all of the traits all of the time: many lack segmentation in the body wall, coelom and musculature.

=== Chordates ===
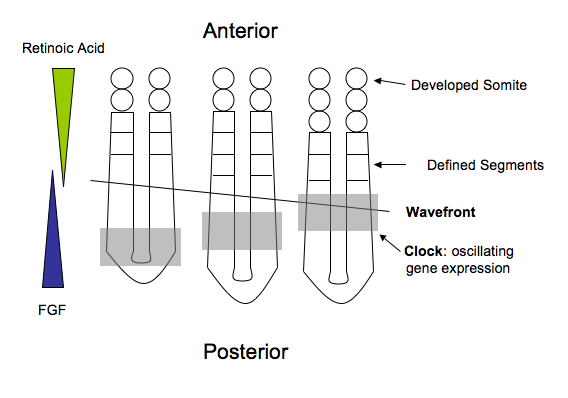
Zebrafish form segments known as somites through a process that is reliant upon gradients of retinoic acid and FGF, as well as periodic oscillation of gene expression.

Although perhaps not as well understood as Drosophila, the embryological process of segmentation has been studied in many vertebrate groups, such as fish (Zebrafish, Medaka), reptiles (Corn Snake), birds (Chicken), and mammals (Mouse). Segmentation in chordates is characterized as the formation of a pair of somites on either side of the midline. This is often referred to as somitogenesis.

In vertebrates, segmentation is most often explained in terms of the clock and wavefront model. The "clock" refers to the periodic oscillation in abundance of specific gene products, such as members of the Hairy and Enhancer of Split (Hes) gene family. Expression starts at the posterior end of the embryo and moves towards the anterior, creating travelling waves of gene expression. The "wavefront" is where clock oscillations arrest, initiating gene expression that leads to the patterning of somite boundaries. The position of the wavefront is defined by a decreasing posterior-to-anterior gradient of FGF signalling. In higher vertebrates including Mouse and Chick, (but not Zebrafish), the wavefront also depends upon an opposing anterior-to-posterior decreasing gradient of retinoic acid which limits the anterior spreading of FGF8; retinoic acid repression of Fgf8 gene expression defines the wavefront as the point at which the concentrations of both retinoic acid and diffusible FGF8 protein are at their lowest. Cells at this point will mature and form a pair of somites. The interaction of other signaling molecules, such as myogenic regulatory factors, with this gradient promotes the development of other structures, such as muscles, across the basic segments. Lower vertebrates such as zebrafish do not require retinoic acid repression of caudal Fgf8 for somitogenesis due to differences in gastrulation and neuromesodermal progenitor function compared to higher vertebrates.

=== Other taxa ===
In other taxa, there is some evidence of segmentation in some organs, but this segmentation is not pervasive to the full list of organs mentioned above for arthropods and annelids. One might think of the serially repeated units in many Cycloneuralia, or the segmented body armature of the chitons (which is not accompanied by a segmented coelom).

== Origin ==
Segmentation can be seen as originating in two ways. To caricature, the 'amplification' pathway would involve a single-segment ancestral organism becoming segmented by repeating itself. This seems implausible, and the 'parcellization' framework is generally preferred – where existing organization of organ systems is 'formalized' from loosely defined packets into more rigid segments. As such, organisms with a loosely defined metamerism, whether internal (as some molluscs) or external (as Onychophora), can be seen as 'precursors' to eusegmented organisms such as annelids or arthropods.

== See also ==
- Metamerism – Segmented body with a serial repetition of organs
- Tagmatization – Grouping of segments into functional units
- Pharyngeal arch – Embryonic precursor structures in vertebrates
- Rhombomere – Transient structure in animal development
