= Drosophila embryogenesis =

Embryogenesis of the fruit fly Drosophila, a popular model system

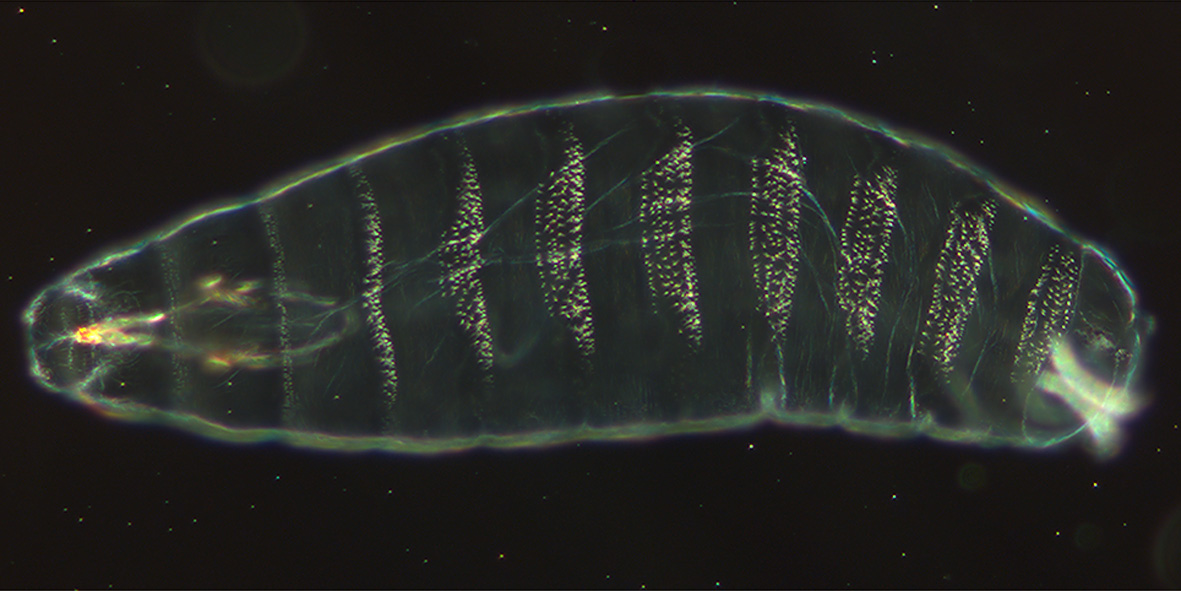
Ventral view of repeating denticle bands on the cuticle of a 22-hour-old embryo. The head is on the left.

Drosophila embryogenesis, the process by which Drosophila (fruit fly) embryos form, is a favorite model system for genetics and developmental biology. The study of its embryogenesis unlocked the century-long puzzle of how development was controlled, creating the field of evolutionary developmental biology. The small size, short generation time, and large brood size make it ideal for genetic studies. Transparent embryos facilitate developmental studies. Drosophila melanogaster was introduced into the field of genetic experiments by Thomas Hunt Morgan in 1909.

== Life cycle ==
Drosophila display a holometabolous method of development, meaning that they have three distinct stages of their post-embryonic life cycle, each with a radically different body plan: larva, pupa and finally, adult. The machinery necessary for the function and smooth transition between these three phases develops during embryogenesis. During embryogenesis, the larval stage fly will develop and hatch at a stage of its life known as the first larval instar. Cells that will produce adult structures are put aside in imaginal discs. During the pupal stage, the larval body breaks down as the imaginal disks grow and produce the adult body. This process is called complete metamorphosis. About 24 hours after fertilization, an egg hatches into a larva, which undergoes three molts taking about 5.5 to 6 days, after which it is called a pupa. The pupa metamorphoses into an adult fly, which takes about 3.5 to 4.5 days. The entire growth process from egg to adult fly takes an estimated 10 to 12 days to complete at 25 °C.

The mother fly produces oocytes that already have anterior-posterior and dorsal-ventral axes defined by maternal activities.

Early embryogenesis, showing the cycles of nuclei divisions in the syncytial blastoderm and the morphogenetic movements of gastrulation.

Embryogenesis in Drosophila is unique among model organisms in that cleavage occurs in a multinucleate syncytium (strictly a coenocyte). Early on, 256 nuclei migrate to the perimeter of the egg, creating the syncytial blastoderm. The germ line segregates from the somatic cells through the formation of pole cells at the posterior end of the embryo. After thirteen mitotic divisions and about 4 hours after fertilization, an estimated 6,000 nuclei have accumulated in the unseparated cytoplasm of the oocyte before they are encompassed by plasma membranes to form cells surrounding the yolk sac, producing a cellular blastoderm.

Like other triploblastic metazoa, gastrulation leads to the formation of three germ layers: the endoderm, mesoderm, and ectoderm. The mesoderm invaginates from the ventral furrow (VF), as does the ectoderm that will give rise to the midgut. The pole cells are internalized by a different route.

Germ band elongation involves many rearrangements of cells, and the appearance of distinct differences in the cells of the three germ bands and various regions of the embryo. The posterior region (including the hindgut) expands and extends towards the anterior pole along the dorsal side of the embryo. At this time, segments of the embryo become visible, creating a striped arrangement along the anterior-posterior axis. The earliest signs of segmentation appear during this phase with the formation of parasegmental furrows. This is also when the tracheal pits form, the first signs of structures for breathing.

Germ band retraction returns the hindgut to the dorsal side of the posterior pole and coincides with overt segmentation. The remaining stages involve the internalization of the nervous system (ectoderm) and the formation of internal organs (mainly mesoderm).

== Anterior-posterior axis patterning in Drosophila ==
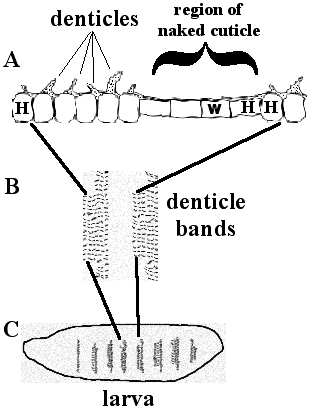
The abdominal cuticular segments of the Drosophila embryo consist of repeating denticle bands separated by naked cuticle.

One of the best understood examples of pattern formation is the patterning along the future head to tail (antero-posterior) axis of the fruit fly Drosophila melanogaster. There are three fundamental types of genes that give way to the developmental structure of the fly: maternal effect genes, segmentation genes, and homeotic genes. The development of Drosophila is particularly well studied, and it is representative of a major class of animals, the insects or insecta. Other multicellular organisms sometimes use similar mechanisms for axis formation, although the relative importance of signal transfer between the earliest cells of many developing organisms is greater than in the example described here.

=== Maternal effect genes ===
mRNA distributions

Protein distributions

The building-blocks of anterior-posterior axis patterning in Drosophila are laid out during egg formation (oogenesis), well before the egg is fertilized and deposited. The maternal effect genes are responsible for the polarity of the egg and of the embryo. The developing egg (oocyte) is polarized by differentially localized mRNA molecules.

The genes that code for these mRNAs, called maternal effect genes, encode for proteins that get translated upon fertilization to establish concentration gradients that span the egg. Bicoid and Hunchback are the maternal effect genes that are most important for patterning of anterior parts (head and thorax) of the Drosophila embryo. Nanos and Caudal are maternal effect genes that are important in the formation of more posterior abdominal segments of the Drosophila embryo.

In embryos from bicoid mutant mothers, the head and thoracic structures are converted to the abdomen making the embryo with posterior structures on both ends, a lethal phenotype.

Cytoskeletal elements such as microtubules are polarized within the oocyte and can be used to allow the localization of mRNA molecules to specific parts of the cell. Maternally synthesized bicoid mRNAs attach to microtubules and are concentrated at the anterior ends of forming Drosophila eggs. In unfertilized eggs, transcripts are still strictly localized at the tip, but immediately after fertilization, a small mRNA gradient is formed in the anterior 20% of the eggs. Another report documents a mRNA gradient up to 40%. nanos mRNA also attaches to a Drosophila egg's cytoskeleton but is concentrated at the posterior end of the egg. hunchback and caudal mRNAs lack special location control systems and are fairly evenly spread throughout the entire interior of the egg cells.

It has been shown that the dsRNA-binding protein STAUFEN (STAU1) is responsible for guiding bicoid, nanos and other proteins, which play a role in forming the anterior-posterior axis, to the correct regions of the embryo to build gradients. When the mRNAs from the maternal effect genes are translated into proteins, a Bicoid protein gradient forms at the anterior end of the egg. Nanos protein forms a gradient at the posterior end. The Bicoid protein blocks translation of caudal mRNA so Caudal protein is of lower concentration at the anterior part of the embryo and at higher concentration at the posterior part of the embryo. This is of opposite direction of the Bicoid protein. The caudal protein then activates later to turn genes on to form the posterior structures during the segmentation phase. Nanos protein creates a posterior-to-anterior slope and is a morphogen that helps in abdomen formation. Nanos protein, in complex with Pumilio protein, binds to the hunchback mRNA and blocks its translation in the posterior end of Drosophila embryos.

The Bicoid, Hunchback, and Caudal proteins are transcription factors. The Bicoid protein is a morphogen as well. The Nanos protein is a translational repressor protein. Bicoid has a DNA-binding homeodomain that binds both DNA and the nanos mRNA. Bicoid binds a specific RNA sequence in the 3′ untranslated region, called the Bicoid 3′-UTR regulatory element, of caudal mRNA and blocks translation.

Hunchback protein levels in the early embryo are significantly augmented by new hunchback gene transcription and translation of the resulting zygotically produced mRNA. During early Drosophila embryogenesis, there are nuclear divisions without cell division. The many nuclei that are produced distribute themselves around the periphery of the cell cytoplasm. Gene expression in these nuclei is regulated by the Bicoid, Hunchback, and Caudal proteins. For example, Bicoid acts as a transcriptional activator of hunchback gene transcription. In order for development to continue, Hunchback is needed in an area that is declining in amount from anterior to posterior. This is created by the Nanos protein whose existence is at a declining slope from posterior to anterior ends.

=== Gap genes ===
Gap genes

The other important function of the gradients of Bicoid, Hunchback, and Caudal proteins is in the transcriptional regulation of other zygotically expressed proteins. Many of these are the protein products derived from members of the "gap" family of developmental control genes. giant, huckebein, hunchback, knirps, Krüppel and tailless are all gap genes. Their expression patterns in the early embryo are determined by the maternal effect gene products and shown in the diagrams on the right side of this page. The gap genes are part of a larger family called the segmentation genes. These genes establish the segmented body plan of the embryo along the anterior-posterior axis. The segmentation genes specify 14 parasegments that are closely related to the final anatomical segments. The gap genes are the first layer of a hierarchical cascade of the segmentation control genes.

=== Additional segmentation genes ===
Pair rule

Two additional classes of segmentation genes are expressed after the gap gene products. The pair-rule genes are expressed in striped patterns of seven bands perpendicular to the anterior-posterior axis. These patterns of expression are established within the syncytial blastoderm. After these initial patterning events, cell membranes form around the nuclei of the syncytial blastoderm converting it to a cellular blastoderm.

The expression patterns of the final class of segmentation genes, the segment polarity genes, are then fine-tuned by interactions between the cells of adjacent parasegments with genes such as engrailed. The Engrailed protein is a transcription factor that is expressed in one row of cells at the edge of each parasegment. This expression pattern is initiated by the pair-rule genes (like even-skipped) that code for transcription factors that regulate the engrailed gene's transcription in the syncytial blastoderm.

Cells that make Engrailed can make the cell-to-cell signaling protein Hedgehog. The motion of Hedgehog is limited by its lipid modification, and so Hedgehog activates a thin stripe of cells anterior to the Engrailed-expressing cells. Only cells to one side of the Engrailed-expressing cells are competent to respond to Hedgehog because they express the receptor protein Patched. Cells with activated Patched receptor make the Wingless protein. Wingless is a secreted protein that acts on the adjacent rows of cells by activating its cell surface receptor, Frizzled.

Wingless acts on Engrailed-expressing cells to stabilize Engrailed expression after the cellular blastoderm forms. The Naked cuticle protein is induced by Wingless to limit the number of rows of cells that express Engrailed. The short-range, reciprocal signaling by Hedgehog and Wingless, held in check by the Patched and Naked proteins, stabilizes the boundary between each segment. The Wingless protein is called "wingless" because of the phenotype of some wingless mutants. Wingless and Hedgehog also function in multiple tissues later in embryogenesis and also during metamorphosis.

The transcription factors that are coded for by segmentation genes regulate yet another family of developmental control genes, the homeotic selector genes. These genes exist in two ordered groups on Drosophila chromosome 3. The order of the genes on the chromosome reflects the order that they are expressed along the anterior-posterior axis of the developing embryo. The Antennapedia group of homeotic selector genes includes labial, antennapedia, sex combs reduced, deformed, and proboscipedia. Labial and Deformed proteins are expressed in head segments where they activate the genes that define head features. Sex-combs-reduced and Antennapedia specify the properties of thoracic segments. The bithorax group of homeotic selector genes control the specializations of the third thoracic segment and the abdominal segments. Mutations in some homeotic genes can often be lethal and the cycle of life will end at embryogenesis.

In 1995, the Nobel Prize for Physiology or Medicine was awarded for studies concerning the genetic control of early embryonic development to Christiane Nüsslein-Volhard, Edward B. Lewis and Eric Wieschaus. Their research on genetic screening for embryo patterning mutants revealed the role played in early embryologic development by homeobox genes like bicoid. An example of a homeotic mutation is the so-called Antennapedia mutation. In Drosophila, antennae and legs are created by the same basic "program", they only differ in a single transcription factor. If this transcription factor is damaged, the fly grows legs on its head instead of antennae. See images of this "antennapedia" mutant and others, at FlyBase. Another example is in the bithorax complex. If nonlethal mutations occur in this complex, it can cause the fly to have two sets of wings, instead of one pair of wings and one pair of halteres, which aid in balance in flight.

== Dorsal-ventral axis ==
Formation of the dorsal-ventral axis is dependent on the ventral nuclear concentration of a maternally synthesized transcription factor called Dorsal. The determination of the dorsal side of the embryo occurs during oogenesis when the oocyte nucleus moves along microtubules from the posterior to the anterior-dorsal margin of the oocyte. The nucleus expresses a protein called Gurken which is secreted locally and thus only activates follicle cells in the dorsal region by interacting with the Torpedo receptor. This inhibits the production of Pipe protein and thus follicular cells expressing Pipe are on the ventral side. Pipe activates an extracellular protease cascade in the perivitelline space between the follicle cells and the egg which results in the cleavage of the Toll-ligand Spätzle and activation of the Toll signaling cascade on the ventral side. Dorsal protein is present throughout embryonic cytoplasm but bound to Cactus which prevents it from translocating to the nucleus. Toll signaling results in the degradation of Cactus which allows Dorsal to enter the nuclei on the ventral side of the blastoderm. Overall, a difference in the localization of the oocyte nucleus becomes a difference in the signaling state of the surrounding follicle cells which then signal to the resulting blastoderm nuclei.

Once in the nucleus, Dorsal activates different genes depending upon its nuclear concentration. This process sets up a gradient between the ventral and dorsal side of the blastoderm embryo with the repression or induction of Dorsal target genes being differentially regulated. At the ventral end of the embryo, blastoderm nuclei exposed to high concentrations of dorsal protein induce the transcription of the transcription factors twist and snail while repressing zerknüllt and decapentaplegic. This results in the formation of the mesoderm. In the lateral regions of the embryo, low nuclear concentrations of Dorsal lead to the expression of rhomboid which identifies future neuroectoderm. More dorsally, active Dpp signaling represses rhomboid thus confining it to the lateral blastoderm nuclei. At the dorsal side of the embryo, blastoderm nuclei where there is little or no nuclear dorsal protein express zerknüllt, tolloid, and decapentaplegic (Dpp). This leads to the specification of non-neural ectoderm and later in the blastula stage to amnioserosa. The ventral activity of the TGF-β family signaling protein Dpp is maintained by the expression of the secreted Dpp-antagonist Sog (short gastrulation) in the neuroectoderm. Sog binds to and prevents Dpp from diffusing to the ventral side of the embryo and through the cleavage of Sog by Tolloid also enables a sharpening of the Dpp gradient on the dorsal side. The DV axis of Drosophila is due to the interaction of two gradients – a ventral concentration of nuclear Dorsal and a dorsal concentration of Dpp activity.

== See also ==
- Border cells
- Morphogenesis
- Pattern formation
- Regional specification

== Sources ==
- Rivera-Pomar, R.; Jackle, H. (1996). "From gradients to stripes in Drosophila embryogenesis: Filling in the gaps". Trends Genet. 12 (11): 478–483. doi:10.1016/0168-9525(96)10044-5. PMID 8973159.
- Russell, Peter J. (2009). iGenetics: A molecular approach (Third ed.). San Francisco, California: Benjamin-Cummings Pub Co. ISBN 978-0321569769.
