= Gap gene =

Gene used to develop body sections in embryos

Expression of some of the gap genes in bands in the Drosophila early embryo

A gap gene is a type of gene involved in the development of the segmented embryos of some arthropods. Gap genes are defined by the effect of a mutation in that gene, which causes the loss of contiguous body segments, resembling a gap in the normal body plan. Each gap gene, therefore, is necessary for the development of a section of the organism.

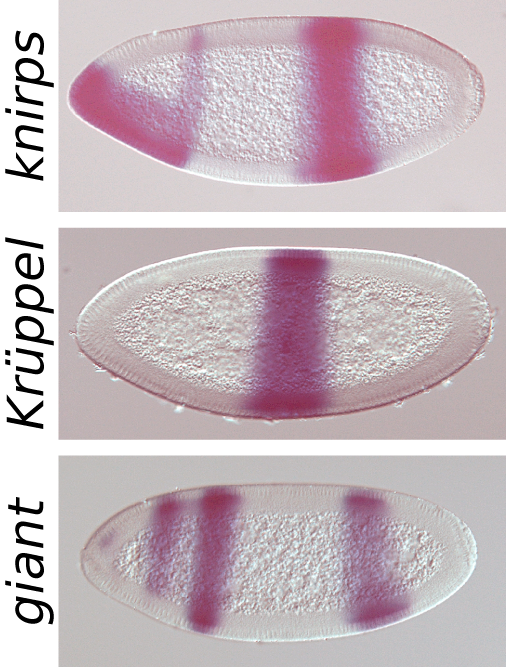
In situ hybridisation against mRNA for some of the gap genes in the Drosophila early embryo

Gap genes were first described by Christiane Nüsslein-Volhard and Eric Wieschaus in 1980. They used a genetic screen to identify genes required for embryonic development in the fruit fly Drosophila melanogaster. They found three genes – knirps, Krüppel and hunchback – where mutations caused deletion of particular stretches of segments. Later work identified more gap genes in the Drosophila early embryo – giant, huckebein and tailless. Further gap genes including orthodenticle and buttonhead are required for the development of the Drosophila head.

Once the gap genes had been identified at the molecular level it was found that each gap gene is expressed in a band in the early embryo generally correlated with the region that is absent in the mutant. In Drosophila the gap genes encode transcription factors, and they directly control the expression of another set of genes involved in segmentation, the pair-rule genes. The gap genes themselves are expressed under the control of maternal effect genes such as bicoid and nanos, and regulate each other to achieve their precise expression patterns.

== Gene activation ==
Expression of tailless is activated by torso protein in the poles of the embryo. Tailless is also regulated in a complex manner by the maternal-effect gene bicoid.

Both embryonically transcribed hunchback and maternally transcribed hunchback are activated by bicoid protein in the anterior and is inhibited in the posterior by nanos protein. Embryonically transcribed hunchback protein is able to exhibit the same effects on Krüppel and knirps as maternally transcribed hunchback.

The Krüppel gene is activated when the bicoid protein gradient declines steeply, at the central part of the embryo. Krüppel is regulated by five regulatory proteins: bicoid, hunchback, tailless, knirps and giant. Krüppel is inhibited by high levels of hunchback, high levels of giant, and tailless, which establishes the anterior boundary of Krüppel expression. Krüppel is also inhibited by knirps and activated by low levels of bicoid and low levels of hunchback, which establishes the posterior boundary of Krüppel expression.

The knirps gene appears to be spontaneously activated. It is repressed by hunchback. Hunchback repression thus defines the anterior boundary of the knirps gene. Due to more efficient inhibition of the knirps gene by hunchback, knirps is expressed more posteriorly in the embryo compared to Krüppel. Tailless protein inhibits knirps gene expression in the posterior part of the embryo, allowing the knirps protein to be expressed only in the central part of the embryo (but more posterior compared to Krüppel). This is due to the ability of both hunchback and tailless to bind to the enhancer regions of knirps.

== Mechanism of action ==
The gap genes code for transcription factors that regulate the expression of pair-rule genes and homeotic genes by competing for binding to their enhancer regions. It has been demonstrated that gap gene expression in the Drosophila blastoderm exhibit a property called canalization, a property of developing organisms to produce a consistent phenotype despite variations in genotype or environment. It has been proposed that canalization is a manifestation of cross regulation of gap genes expression and can be understood as arising from the actions of attractors in the gap gene dynamical system.

== See also ==
- Drosophila embryogenesis
- Pair-rule gene
