= Gooseberry Island, Newfoundland and Labrador =

Human settlement in Canada

Coordinates: 48°53′00″N 53°36′57″W

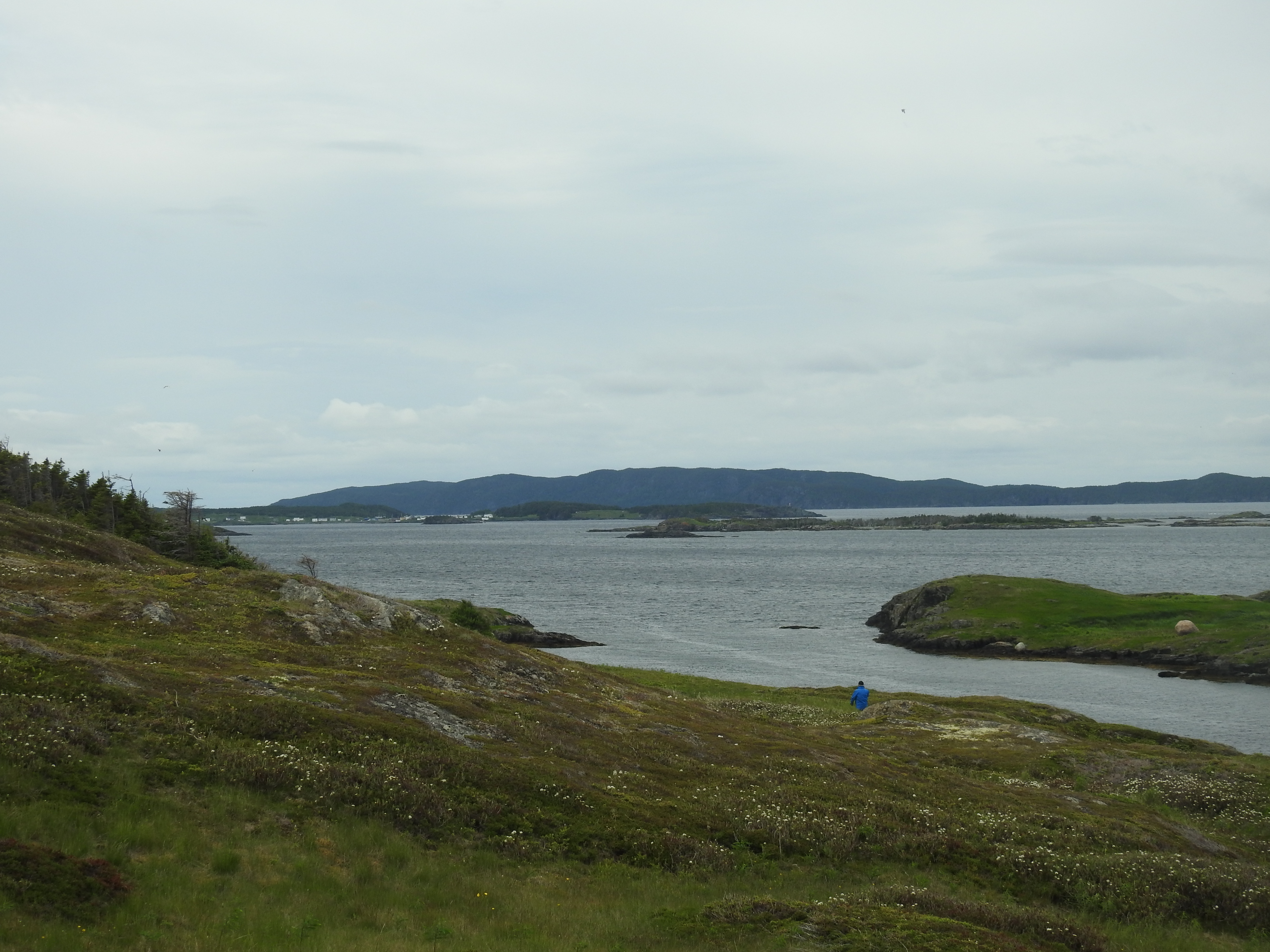
Gooseberry Island looking west towards St.Brendans

Gooseberry Island was a settlement of about nine families in 1864 in the Bonavista Bay area. The first Waymaster was Charles Harris but the Way Office closed in 1873. It reopened in 1882 at which time it became a Post Office and the first Postmaster was Ambrose Janes.

== See also ==
- List of unincorporated communities in Newfoundland and Labrador
- List of people from Newfoundland and Labrador
