= Homeotic protein bicoid =

Protein-coding gene in the species Drosophila melanogaster

Identifiers
- Organism: Drosophila melanogaster
- Symbol: bcd
- UniProt: P09081
Search for
- Structures: Swiss-model
- Domains: InterPro

(Top) Nuclear Bicoid protein gradient in a fixed transgenic Drosophila embryo carrying a Bicoid–GFP fusion gene. Image courtesy of Julien O. Dubuis and Thomas Gregor. (Bottom) Bicoid–GFP protein (green) and FISH-labeled bicoid mRNA (red) in the anterior tip of a fixed transgenic Drosophila embryo. Both embryos are oriented with the anterior pole at left. Image courtesy of Shawn C. Little and Thomas Gregor (see Little et al. for methods).

Homeotic protein bicoid is encoded by the bcd maternal effect gene in Drosophilia. Homeotic protein bicoid concentration gradient patterns the anterior-posterior (A-P) axis during Drosophila embryogenesis. Bicoid was the first protein demonstrated to act as a morphogen. Although bicoid is important for the development of Drosophila and other higher dipterans, it is absent from most other insects, where its role is accomplished by other genes.

== Role in axial patterning ==
Bicoid mRNA is actively localized to the anterior of the fruit fly egg during oogenesis along microtubules by the motor protein dynein, and retained there through association with cortical actin. Translation of bicoid is regulated by its 3′ UTR and begins after egg deposition. Diffusion and convection within the syncytium produce an exponential gradient of Bicoid protein within roughly one hour, after which Bicoid nuclear concentrations remain approximately constant through cellularization. An alternative model proposes the formation of a bicoid mRNA gradient in the embryo along cortical microtubules which then serves as template for translation of the Bicoid protein to form the Bicoid protein gradient. Bicoid protein represses the translation of caudal mRNA and enhances the transcription of anterior gap genes including hunchback, orthodenticle, and buttonhead.

== Structure and function ==
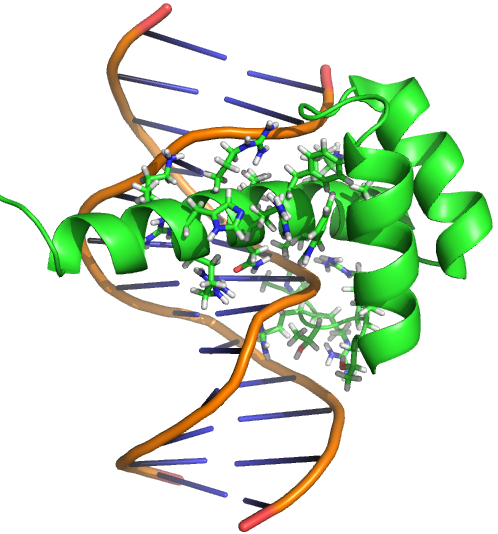
PyMOL rendering of Bicoid homeodomain bound to its consensus site

Bicoid is one of the few proteins which uses its homeodomain to bind both DNA and RNA targets to regulate their transcription and translation, respectively. The nucleic acid-binding homeodomain of Bicoid has been solved by NMR. Bicoid contains an arginine-rich motif (part of the helix shown axially in this image) that is similar to the one found in the HIV protein REV and is essential for its nucleic acid binding.

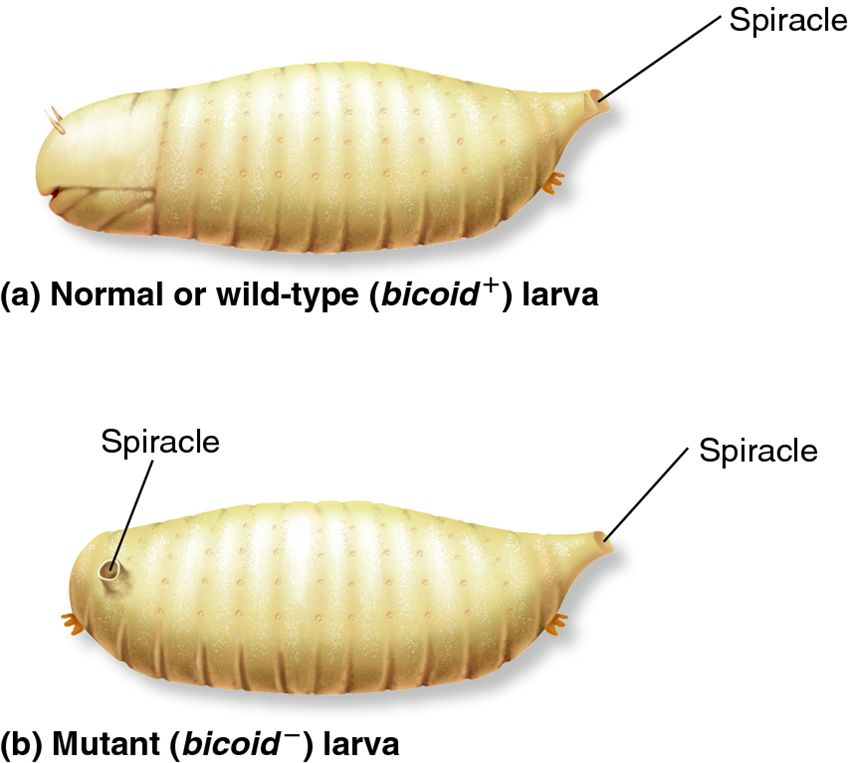
Bicoid mutant produces no head

Bicoid protein gradient formation is one of the earliest steps in fruit fly embryo A-P patterning. The proper spatial expression of downstream genes relies on the robustness of this gradient to common variations between embryos, including in the number of maternally-deposited bicoid mRNAs and in egg size. Comparative phylogenetic and experimental evolution studies suggest an inherent mechanism for robust generation of a scaled Bicoid protein gradient. Mechanisms that have been proposed to effect this scaling include non-linear degradation of Bicoid, nuclear retention as a size-dependent regulator of Bicoid protein's effective diffusion coefficient, and scaling of cytoplasmic streaming.

== See also ==
- Maternal effect
