= Eric F. Wieschaus =

American evolutionary developmental biologist (born 1947)

Eric Francis Wieschaus
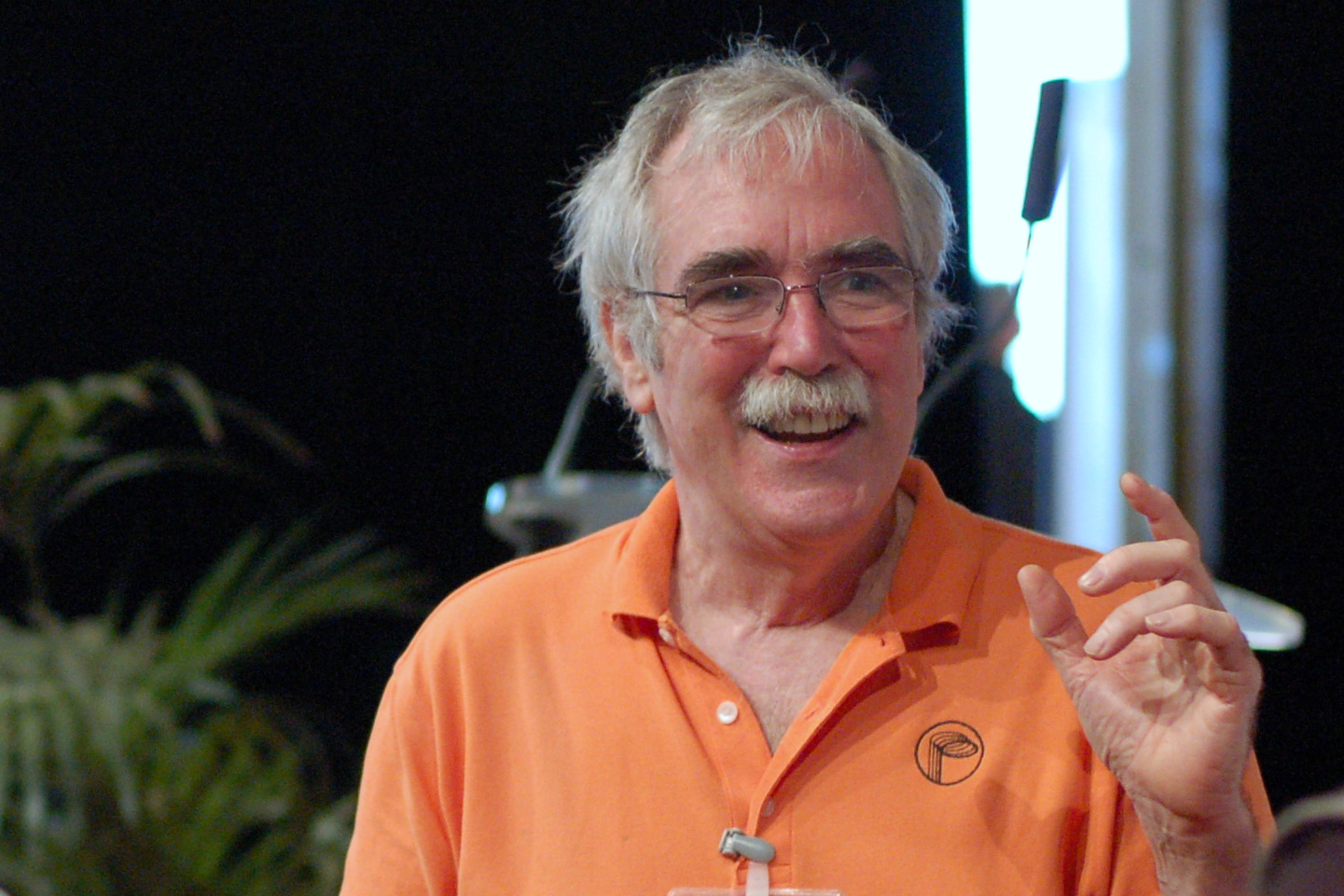
- Eric F. Wieschaus in 2011
- Born: June 8, 1947 (age 79); South Bend, Indiana, U.S.
- Education: University of Notre Dame (B.S.); Yale University (Ph.D.)
- Known for: Embryogenesis
- Awards: Genetics Society of America Medal (1995); Nobel Prize in Physiology or Medicine (1995)
- Scientific career
- Fields: Developmental biology
- Workplaces: Princeton University; Robert Wood Johnson Medical School

Eric Francis Wieschaus (born June 8, 1947, in South Bend, Indiana) is an American evolutionary developmental biologist and 1995 Nobel Prize-winner.

== Early life ==
Born in South Bend, Indiana, he attended John Carroll Catholic High School in Birmingham, Alabama before attending the University of Notre Dame for his undergraduate studies (B.S., biology), and Yale University (Ph.D., biology) for his graduate work.

== Scientific career ==
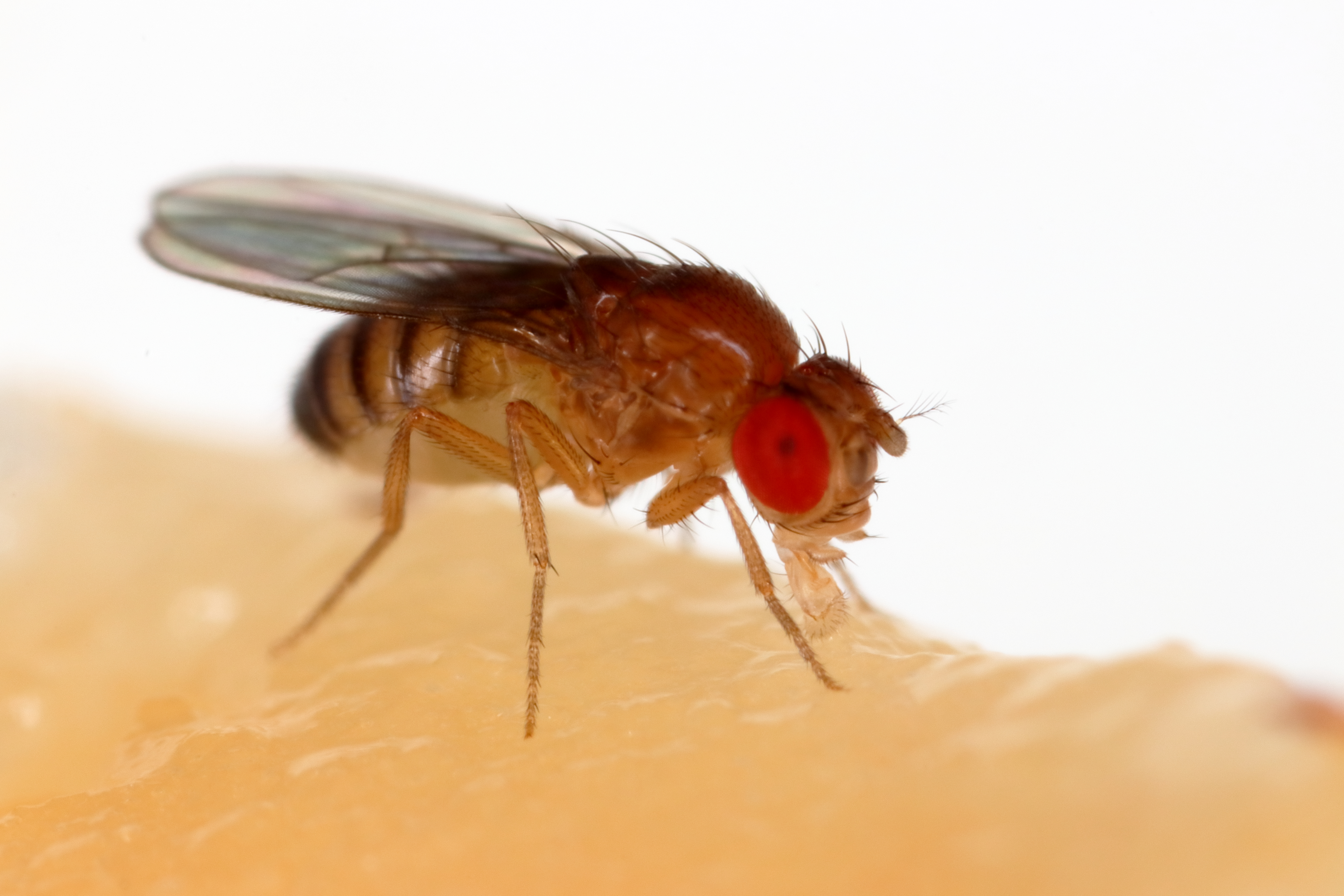
Drosophila Melanogaster, the object of Wieschaus's science

In 1978, he moved to his first independent job, at the European Molecular Biology Laboratory in Heidelberg, Germany and moved from Heidelberg to Princeton University in the United States in 1981.

Much of his research has focused on embryogenesis in the fruit fly Drosophila melanogaster, specifically in the patterning that occurs in the early Drosophila embryo. Most of the gene products used by the embryo at these stages are already present in the unfertilized egg and were produced by maternal transcription during oogenesis. A small number of gene products, however, are supplied by transcription in the embryo itself. He has focused on these "zygotically" active genes because he believes the temporal and spatial pattern of their transcription may provide the triggers controlling the normal sequence of embryonic development. Saturation of all the possible mutations on each chromosome by random events to test embryonic lethality was done by Eric Wieschaus. This body of science eventually was termed the Heidelberg screen.

In 1995, he was awarded the Nobel Prize in Physiology or Medicine with Edward B. Lewis and Christiane Nüsslein-Volhard as co-recipients, for their work revealing the genetic control of embryonic development.

As of 2018, Wieschaus is the Squibb Professor in Molecular Biology at Princeton. He was formerly Adjunct Professor of Biochemistry at the University of Medicine and Dentistry of New Jersey – Robert Wood Johnson Medical School.

== Personal life ==
He has three daughters and is married to molecular biologist Gertrud Schüpbach, who is also a professor of Molecular Biology at Princeton University, working on Drosophila oogenesis.

Wieschaus is an atheist and is one of the 77 Nobel Laureates who signed the 2007 petition to repeal the Louisiana Science Education Act.

== Awards and honors ==
- Member of the American Academy of Arts and Sciences, elected 1993
- Member of the National Academy of Sciences, elected 1994
- Nobel Prize in Physiology or Medicine, 1995
- Member of the American Philosophical Society, elected 1998
- Mendel Medal of the Genetics Society, 1999
- Society for Developmental Biology Lifetime Achievement Award, 2018
