= Engrailed (gene) =

Protein family

engrailed is a homeodomain transcription factor involved in many aspects of multicellular development. First known for its role in arthropod embryological development, working in consort with the Hox genes, engrailed has been found to be important in other areas of development. It has been identified in many bilaterians, including the arthropods, vertebrates, echinoderms, molluscs, nematodes, brachiopods, and polychaetes. It acts as a "selector" gene, conferring a specific identity to defined areas of the body, and co-ordinating the expression of downstream genes.

== Protein ==
engrailed (en) encodes the homeodomain-containing transcription factor protein Engrailed. Homologous Engrailed proteins are found in a diversity of organisms. When expressed in the ectoderm, engrailed is involved in the production of skeletal material. engrailed, or genes with very similar sequences, are found in all bilaterian animals. engrailed plays a number of crucial roles in brain development across many species, including the determination of the hindbrain/midbrain border and aiding in neuronal axon guidance. This has led to the suggestion that the gene originally served a neurogenetic function in the ancestral bilaterian. It has been observed to express in the repeated units of arthropods, molluscs, onychophora, annelids, echinoderms and amphioxus.

Whilst the gene was traditionally understood to have served a role in segment polarization in the ancestral bilaterian, its association with shell formation in molluscs has produced an alternative hypothesis: that the ancestral role was associated with mineralization. Even where this trait has been secondarily lost (such as in the Onychophora) the gene is still expressed, marking the 'ghosts' of the shelly plates that the ancestral onychophora (i.e. lobopods) are thought to have borne.

== Arthropods ==
In the model organism, Drosophila melanogaster, engrailed acts as a segment polarity gene in early embryonic development. It is initially expressed in stages 8–11 of development in 14 isolated bands of cells along the embryo's anterior–posterior axis. The cells expressing engrailed define the anterior-most region of each parasegment. Once proper segments form, engrailed-expressing cells are found in the posterior-most region of each segment.

engrailed homologs have also been found in many other arthropod species, including grasshoppers, milkweed bugs, centipedes, and beetles.

However, the ancestral role of engrailed was not in marking segmentation: it does not fulfill this role in Onychophora.

== Molluscs ==
Although it is not necessary for mineralization to occur, molluscs use engrailed to mark the boundaries of shell-forming fields (this has been demonstrated in cuttlefish, gastropods, bivalves, Polyplacophora, and scaphopods) but it has also been co-opted by the cephalopods in the production of evolutionary novelties such as the tentacles, eyes and funnel. This plasticity in gene function is characteristic of genes ancestrally associated with the nervous system, for instance the Hox genes, which are also associated with a wide range of derived organs in the cephalopods, but are involved in shell formation in gastropods. The gene has been sequenced in all groups of shelled molluscs, although for some time it eluded identification in the squid Loligo.

In the scaphopods, engrailed is active in the development of the larval shell, but not the adult conch (a separate entity), suggesting a different evolutionary origin of the mature shell. In cephalopods, engrailed appears to demark the shell field, but is not necessary for shell formation itself (skeletogenesis).

It has been argued that engrailed was only co-opted to skeletal function in molluscs, and that its original function was related to segmentation, not biomineralization; whilst there is no consensus yet on which of these alternatives is correct, a role in biomineralization seems the more parsimonious.

== See also ==
- EN2 (gene)
