= Pair-rule gene =

Gene involved in the development of segmented embryos of insects

Expression of the pair-rule genes even-skipped and fushi tarazu in alternating bands in the Drosophila early embryo. Each band corresponds to one parasegment.

A pair-rule gene is a type of gene involved in the development of the segmented embryos of insects. Pair-rule genes are expressed as a result of differing concentrations of gap gene proteins, which encode transcription factors controlling pair-rule gene expression. Pair-rule genes are defined by the effect of a mutation in that gene, which causes the loss of the normal developmental pattern in alternating segments.

Pair-rule genes were first described by Christiane Nüsslein-Volhard and Eric Wieschaus in 1980. They used a genetic screen to identify genes required for embryonic development in the fruit fly Drosophila melanogaster. In normal unmutated Drosophila, each segment produces bristles called denticles in a band arranged on the side of the segment closer to the head (the anterior). They found five genes – even-skipped, hairy, odd-skipped, paired and runt – where mutations caused the deletion of a particular region of every alternate segment. For example, in even-skipped, the denticle bands of alternate segments are missing, which results in an embryo having half the number of denticle bands. Later work identified more pair-rule genes in the Drosophila early embryo – fushi tarazu, odd-paired and sloppy paired.

Once the pair-rule genes had been identified at the molecular level it was found that each gene is expressed in alternate parasegments – regions in the embryo that are closely related to segments, but are slightly out of register. Each parasegment includes the posterior part of one (future) segment, and an anterior part of the next (more posterior) segment. The bands of expression of the pair-rule genes correspond to the regions missing in the mutant. The expression of the pair-rule genes in bands is dependent both upon direct regulation by the gap genes and on regulatory interactions between the pair-rule genes themselves.

== See also ==
- Drosophila embryogenesis
- Gap gene
