= How the Snake Lost Its Legs =

Book by Lewis I. Held, Jr.

- Cover of first edition, 2014
- Author: Lewis I. Held, Jr.
- Illustrator: The author
- Subject: Evolutionary developmental biology
- Publisher: Cambridge University Press
- Publication date: 2014

How the Snake Lost Its Legs: Curious Tales from the Frontier of Evo-Devo is a 2014 book on evolutionary developmental biology by Lewis I. Held, Jr. The title pays homage to Rudyard Kipling's Just So Stories, (Note: Held calls the book, "A factual homage to Rudyard Kipling's fanciful Just So Stories.") but the "tales" are strictly scientific, explaining how a wide range of animal features evolved, in molecular detail. The book has been admired by other biologists as both accurate and accessible.

== Context ==
Messenger RNA distributions from front to back of the fruit fly embryo, the model organism of Held's laboratory

Lewis Irving Held, Jr. is a professor of developmental genetics at Texas Tech University. His laboratory is known for its research on pattern formation in the fruit fly embryo. His books on evolutionary developmental biology (evo-devo) include Imaginal Discs: The Genetic and Cellular Logic of Pattern Formation (2002), Quirks of Human Anatomy: An Evo-Devo Look at the Human Body (2009), and Deep Homology? Uncanny Similarities of Humans and Flies Uncovered by Evo-Devo (2017). In Held's view, Quirks, Snake, and Deep Homology form a trilogy on evo-devo.

== Book ==
=== Contents ===
How the Snake Lost Its Legs is ostensibly organised into six chapters, but in effect into three parts. The first chapter serves as an introduction and overview. The next four chapters provide what Held calls "the meatier aspects of evo-devo" with "many gristly facts" to chew over and "many tough lessons" to digest. The sixth, he writes, offers "tastier treats".

The first chapter introduces "the first two-sided animal", the urbilaterian which lived some 600 million years ago. Held calls the discovery that every bilaterally symmetric animal's body is shaped by the same set of genes "evo-devo's greatest revelation". That group of animals includes nematodes, annelids, molluscs and echinoderms, among other phyla. He explains, with detailed diagrams of arthropod and chordate development and a brief, richly-cited but conversational text, how that symmetry is produced.

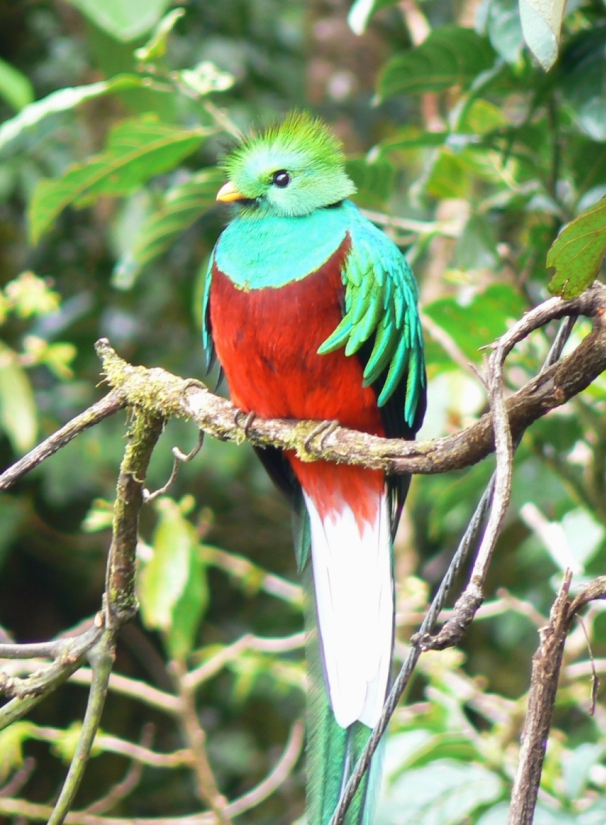
"How the quetzal got its crest" is one of the reliably-cited Just So stories in the book.

The next four chapters are on the fly, the butterfly, the snake, and the cheetah. Each consists of three to eight sections named in the style of Rudyard Kipling's Just So Stories, with titles like "How the butterfly got its spots" or "How the snake elongated its body", though a couple of sections use "Why?" rather than "How?", as in "Why the fly twirls his penis" (it rotates during embryonic development under the control of different genes). In these chapters, Held explains the mechanics of evolutionary developmental biology, complete with accounts of what genes such as hox, hedgehog, and engrailed do to shape bodies.

The third part is a single chapter providing "An evo-devo bestiary," a long list of stories, such as "How the turtle got its shell", "How the vampire bat reinvented running", "How the quetzal got its crest", and "How the firefly got its flashlight". These are Just So only in name, since each one is reliably cited to recent research rather than an author's whimsy. Since by this point the reader has been introduced to the core elements of the evo-devo gene toolkit, Held makes each section brief, 50 stories in 32 pages, and minimally technical: he discusses what the evo-devo system achieves in terms of each animal's structures and organs, ecology and behaviour.

The main text is supported by an accurate glossary and thorough index. Glossary terms are printed in boldface in the text, a helpful feature, while the glossary, like the text, is cited to the key research papers on which the book is based. The book thus provides a wide overview of evo-devo, with guidance on how to read more deeply on any chosen aspect.

=== Publication ===
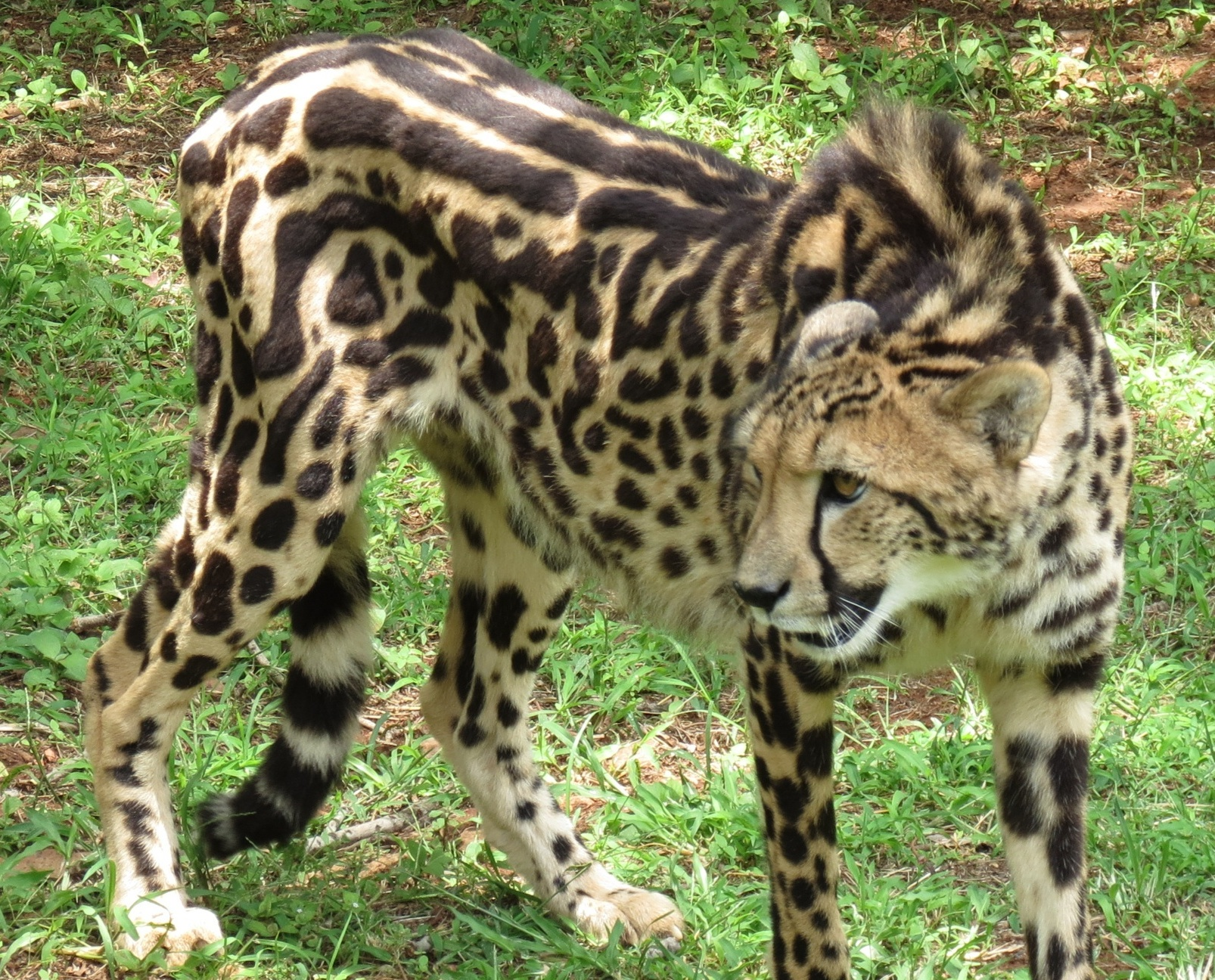
The "king cheetah" colour morph helps to elucidate How the Cheetah Got his Spots.

The book was published by Cambridge University Press as a paperback in 2014 (ISBN 978-1-107-62139-8). The main text is 148 pages, with an 8-page glossary of evo-devo, and over 2500 references taking up 122 pages.

It is illustrated with monochrome diagrams, drawings and photographs in the text, and 8 pages of colour photographs. Held created the diagrams and drawings.

== Reception ==
The taxonomist Marc Srour writes that Held must be commended for not oversimplifying evo-devo, since, "The need to combine precise genetic and developmental labwork with phylogenetic systematics and homology inference means that simplifying the whole ordeal for a lay audience is extremely tricky." Srour sets the book alongside those of Stephen Jay Gould and Sean B. Carroll's Endless Forms Most Beautiful as a showcase of evo-devo. He writes that Held has "give[n] us a readable, in-depth look at evo-devo and all the questions it can answer, from the important, to the fascinating, to the weird/cool facts you can repeat whenever you're at the pub. It's accessible to non-biologists and laymen, useful for teachers and undergrads, and ... researcher[s]."

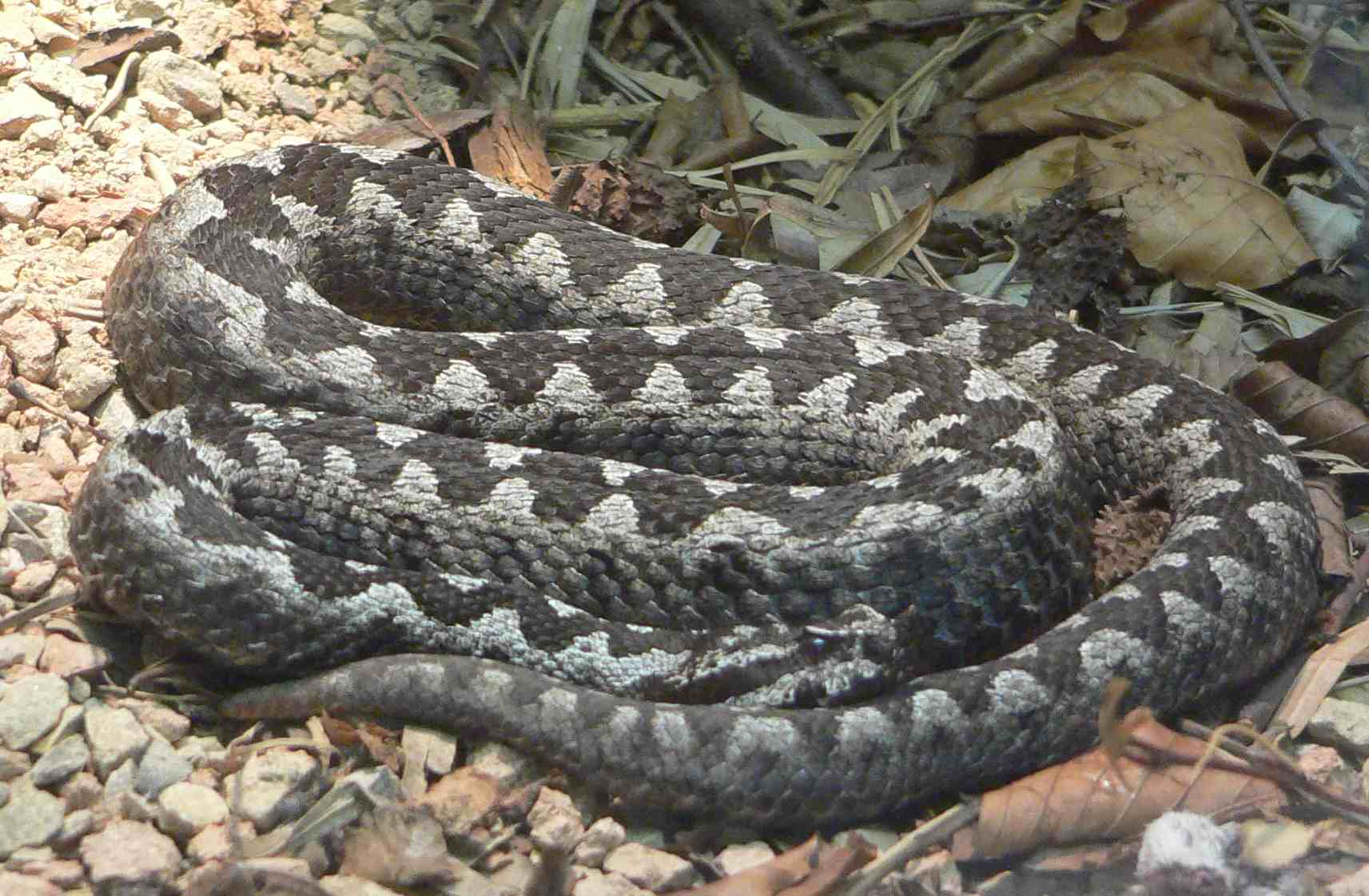
Held discusses how snakes such as Vipera ammodytes generate asymmetric patterns along their backs.

The evolutionary biologist Larry Flammer "warns" readers that when they look at the pictures or study Held's diagrams, they, "will be captivated by the full-page captions, and probably drawn into the effort to really understand what is happening. The graphics do, indeed, help immensely to do this." Flammer notes, too, that many of the "nuts and bolts of evolution, deeper than just natural selection" are on display in the book, revealing, "precisely what genetic/physiological mechanisms are being selected for".

The molecular biologist Arnaud Martin observes that, "As children, we have all wondered about 'the How and the Why' of animal features, and if you are reading this it is in fact quite possible that a similar inquisitiveness still burns within you. The tone of How the Snake Lost its Legs finds its roots in the famous Just So Stories of Rudyard Kipling by tickling this curiosity with the formulaic How the leopard/elephant/camel got its spots/trunk/hump. Held's ability to captivate the reader's imagination compares to the mischievousness of Kipling's pourquoi stories," but the reader, "is also encouraged to extrapolate from general principles by the constant reminder that animals use a conserved set of developmental genes to construct their bodies." Martin finds evo-devo fascinating, "inherently colorful and well placed to fulfill the dual goal of etiological myths: explaining origins and causes while also stirring imagination and awe. Overall, the latest opus by Lewis Held Jr. fits that niche nicely, and shines by its ability to span essential concepts and empirical work with enough rhetoric[al] punch. It is accessible to most readers with a light background in biology", though not as suitable for "the [university] classroom as Held's Quirks of Human Anatomy."

== See also ==
- Endless Forms Most Beautiful (Sean B. Carroll, 2005)

== Sources ==
- Held, Lewis Irving (2014). How the Snake Lost its Legs : Curious Tales from the Frontier of Evo-Devo. Cambridge University Press. ISBN 978-1-107-62139-8.
