= Remarkable Creatures =

Remarkable Creatures may refer to:

- Remarkable Creatures, a novel by Tracy Chevalier
- Remarkable Creatures, a book and monthly New York Times column by Sean B. Carroll
