= Endless Forms Most Beautiful (book) =

2005 evo-devo book by Sean B. Carroll

- Author: Sean B. Carroll
- Subject: Evolutionary developmental biology (evo-devo)
- Genre: Popular science
- Publisher: W. W. Norton
- Publication date: 2005
- Publication place: USA
- Pages: 331
- Followed by: The Making of the Fittest

Endless Forms Most Beautiful: The New Science of Evo Devo and the Making of the Animal Kingdom is a 2005 book by the molecular biologist Sean B. Carroll. It presents a summary of the emerging field of evolutionary developmental biology and the role of toolkit genes. It has won numerous awards for science communication.

The book's somewhat controversial argument is that evolution in animals (though no doubt similar processes occur in other organisms) proceeds mostly by modifying the way that regulatory genes, which do not code for structural proteins (such as enzymes), control embryonic development. In turn, these regulatory genes turn out to be based on a very old set of highly conserved genes which Carroll nicknames the toolkit. Almost identical sequences can be found across the animal kingdom, meaning that toolkit genes such as Hox must have evolved before the Cambrian radiation which created most of the animal body plans that exist today. These genes are used and reused, occasionally by duplication but far more often by being applied unchanged to new functions. Thus the same signal may be given at a different time in development, in a different part of the embryo, creating a different effect on the adult body. Carroll argues that this explains how so many body forms are created with so few structural genes. Along with Carroll's The Making of the Fittest, it was the basis for the PBS documentary What Darwin Never Knew.

It has been called the most important popular science book since Richard Dawkins's The Blind Watchmaker "and in effect a sequel [to it]."

== Author ==
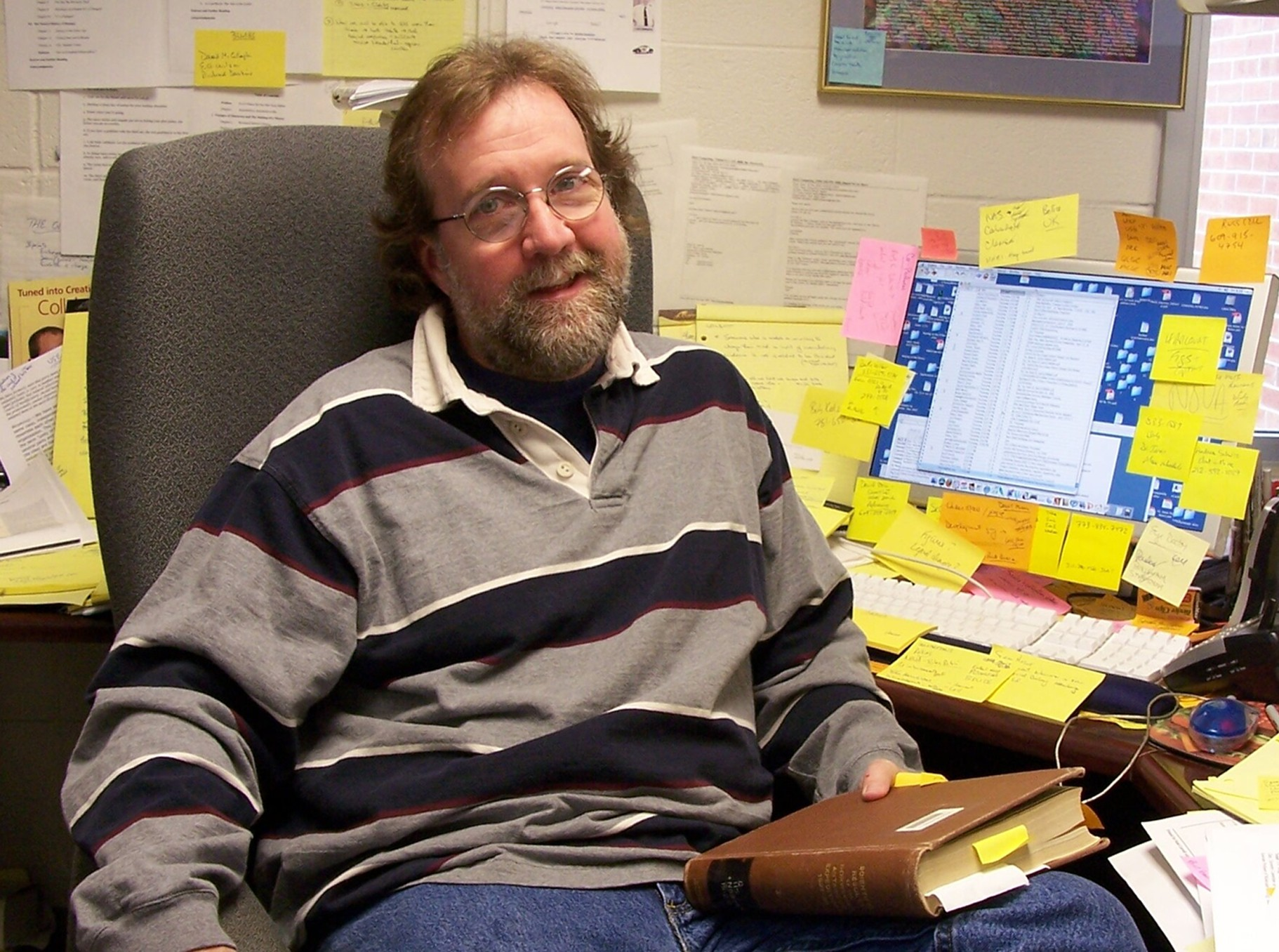
Sean B. Carroll in 2008

Sean B. Carroll is a professor of molecular biology and genetics at the University of Wisconsin–Madison. He studies the evolution of cis-regulatory elements (pieces of non-coding DNA) which help to regulate gene expression in developing embryos, using the fruit fly Drosophila as the model organism. He has won the Shaw Scientist Award and the Stephen Jay Gould Prize for his work.

== Book ==
=== Context ===
The book's title quotes from the last sentence of Charles Darwin's 1859 The Origin of Species, in which he described the evolution of all living organisms from a common ancestor: "endless forms most beautiful and most wonderful have been, and are being, evolved." Darwin, however, was unable to explain how those body forms actually came into being. The early 20th-century modern synthesis of evolution and genetics, too, largely ignored embryonic development to explain the form of organisms, since population genetics appeared to be an adequate explanation of how forms evolved. That task was finally undertaken at the end of the 20th century with the arrival of recombinant DNA technology, when biologists were able to start to explore how development was actually controlled.

=== Contents ===
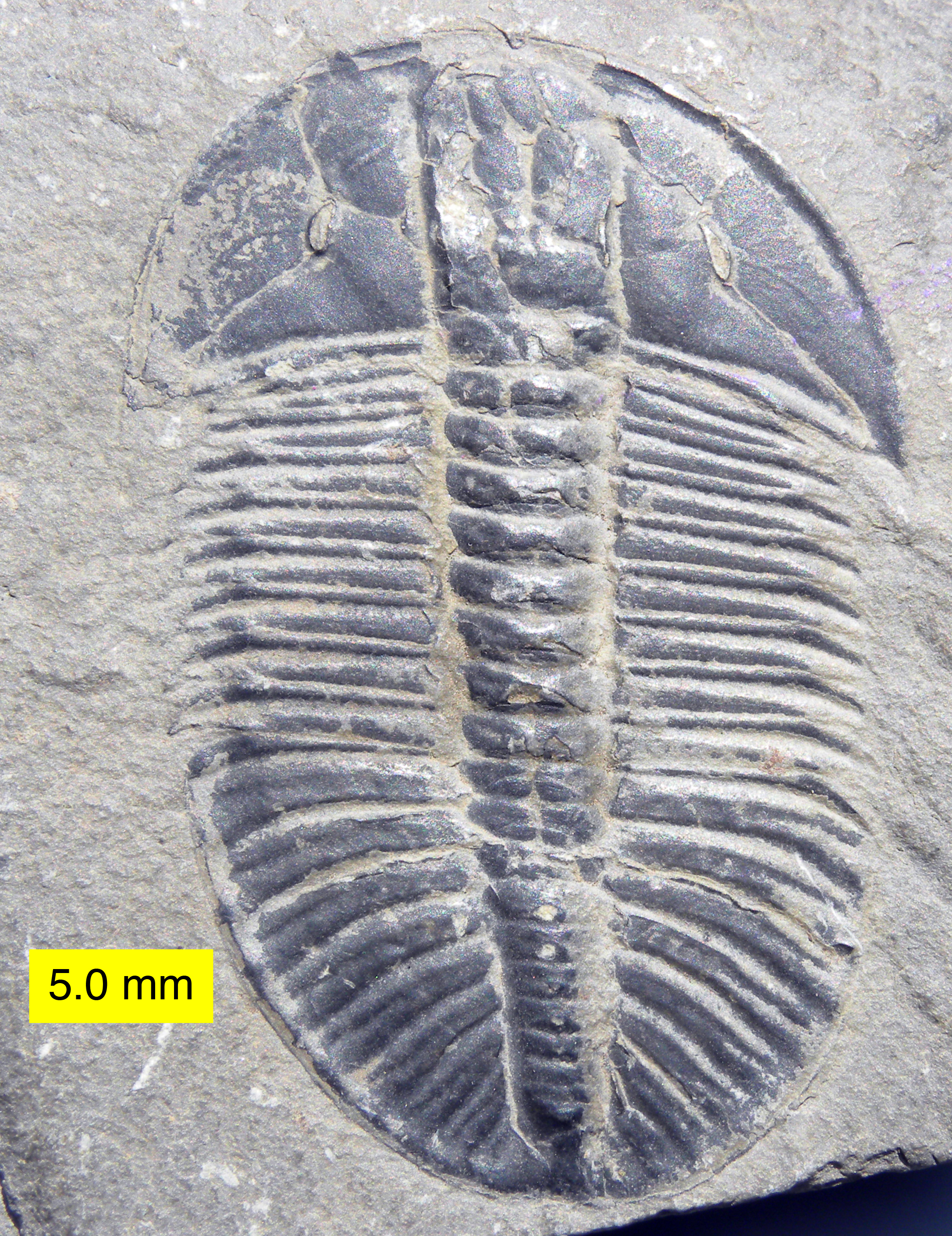
The body of a trilobite is made of many similar modules (body segments with pairs of appendages). These could be made by repeated use of the same toolkit genes.

Part I The Making of Animals
1. Animal Architecture: Modern Forms, Ancient Designs

Carroll argues that many animals have a modular design with repeated parts, as in trilobites with repeated segments, or the repeated fingers of a human hand.

2. Monsters, Mutants, and Master Genes

Embryologists study how bodies develop, and the abnormalities when things go wrong, such as homeotic variants when one body part is changed into another (for instance, a fruit fly antenna becomes a leg with the Antennapedia mutant).

3. From E. coli to Elephants

This chapter tells the tale of the genetic code, and the lac operon. François Jacob and Jacques Monod showed that the environment and genetic switches together control gene expression. He discusses Christiane Nüsslein-Volhard and Eric Wieschaus's work on the genetic control of embryonic development. He introduces the evo-devo gene toolkit.

4. Making Babies: 25,000 Genes, Some Assembly Required

Carroll looks at how a fruit fly's embryonic development is controlled and describes his own discoveries (back in 1994).

5. The Dark Matter of the Genome: Operating Instructions for the Tool Kit

The chapter describes how genes are switched on and off in a precisely choreographed time sequence and 3-dimensional pattern in the developing embryo and how the logic can be modified by evolution to create different animal bodies.

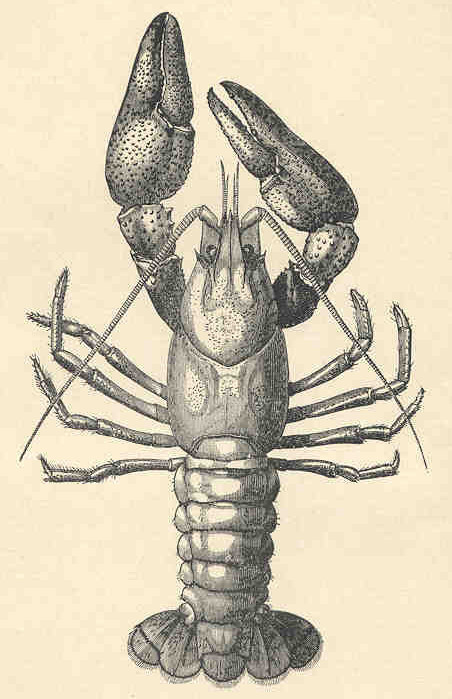
Crayfish limbs are highly specialised, adapted by evo-devo gene toolkit changes from the simple appendages of their trilobite-like ancestors.

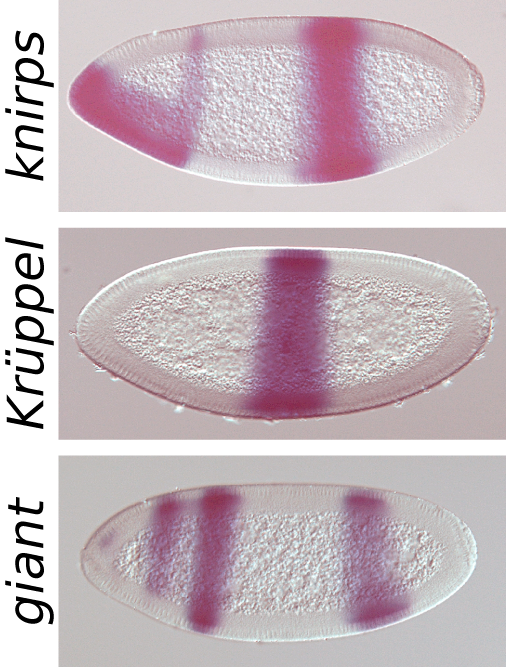
This fruit fly embryo is stained to show the expression of some of the genes (named) that control its development.

Part II Fossils, Genes, and the Making of Animal Diversity
6. The Big Bang of Animal Evolution

The Cambrian radiation saw an explosion in the variety of animal body plans, from flatworms and molluscs to arthropods and vertebrates. Carroll explains how shifting the pattern of Hox gene expression shaped the bodies of different types of arthropods and different types of vertebrates.

7. Little Bangs: Wings and Other Revolutionary Inventions

This chapter explains how evolution goes to work within a lineage, specialising arthropod limbs from all being alike to "all of the different implements a humble crayfish carries", with (he writes) more gizmos than a Swiss Army knife.

8. How the Butterfly Got Its Spots

Echoing the titles of Rudyard Kipling's Just So Stories, Carroll shows how butterfly wing patterns evolved, including his discovery of the role of the Distal-less gene there, until then known in limb development. Evidently, a genetic switch could be reused for different purposes.

9. Paint It Black

Carroll looks at zebra stripes, industrial melanism in the peppered moth and the spots of big cats, all examples of the control of pattern in animals, down to molecular level.

10. A Beautiful Mind: The Making of Homo sapiens.

This chapter discusses how humans differ from other apes and why there are not many structural genes for the differences. Most of the changes are in genetic control, not in proteins.

11. Endless Forms Most Beautiful

Carroll concludes by revisiting Darwin's Origin of Species, starting with how Darwin evolved the final paragraph of his book, leaving only these four words "completely untouched throughout all versions and editions". He shows that evo-devo is a cornerstone of a synthesis of evolution, genetics, and embryology, replacing the "Modern synthesis" of 20th century biology.

=== Illustrations ===
The book is illustrated with photographs, such as of developing fruit fly embryos dyed to show the effects of toolkit genes, and with line drawings by Jamie W. Carroll, Josh P. Klaiss and Leanne M. Olds.

== Awards ==
- Discover magazine's Top Science Books of the Year, 2005
- USA Today's Top Science Books of the Year, 2005
- Banta Prize, Wisconsin Library Association, 2006
- Finalist, 2005 Los Angeles Times Book Prize (Science and Technology)
- Finalist, 2006 National Academy of Sciences Communication Award

== Reception ==
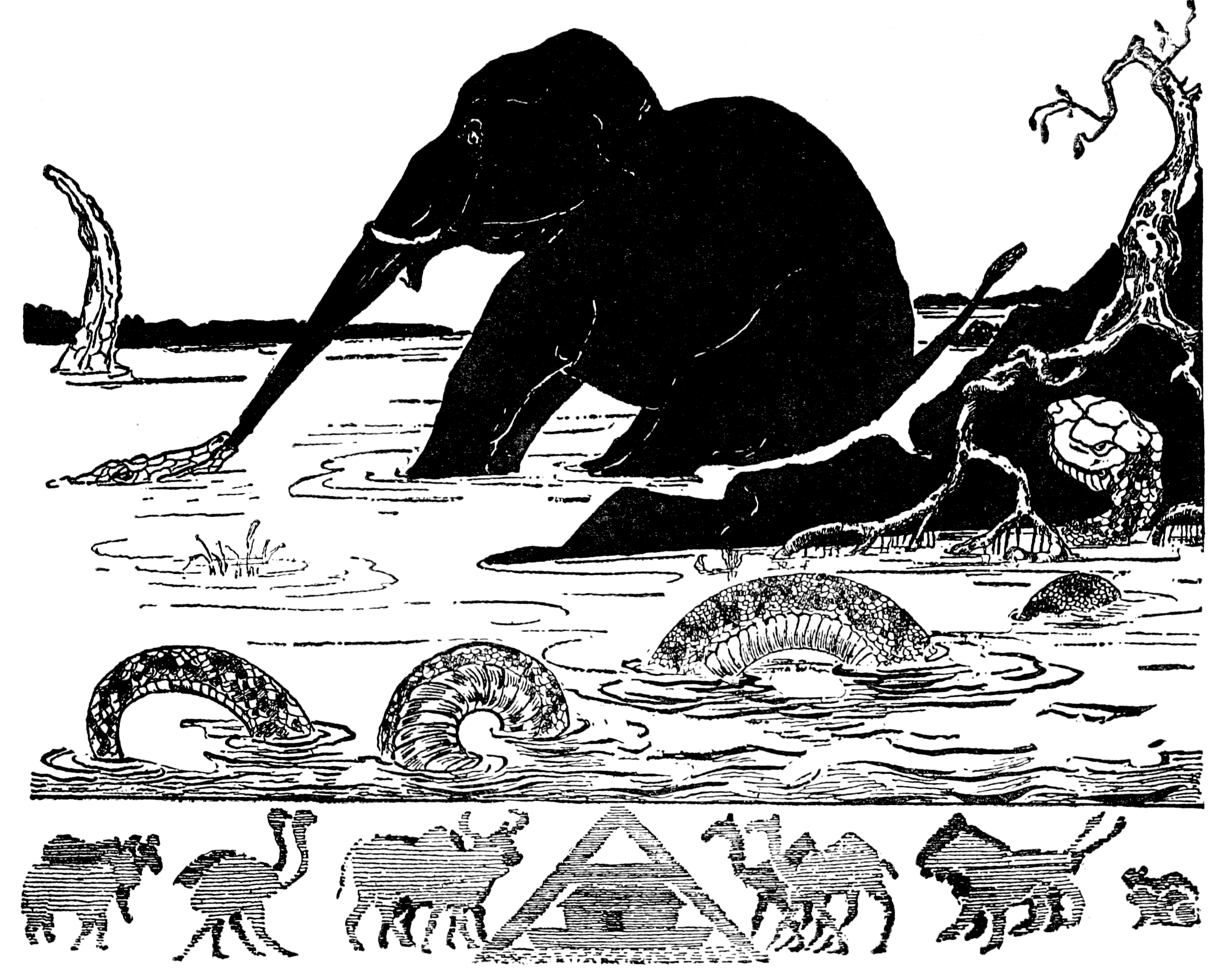
"Kipling would be riveted": the book explains how animals actually acquired the features that Rudyard Kipling wrote about in his 1902 Just So Stories, such as "How the Elephant got his Trunk".

The evolutionary biologist Lewis Wolpert, writing in American Scientist, called Endless Forms Most Beautiful "a beautiful and very important book." He summarized the message of the book with the words "As Darwin's theory made clear, these multitudinous forms developed as a result of small changes in offspring and natural selection of those that were better adapted to their environment. Such variation is brought about by alterations in genes that control how cells in the developing embryo behave. Thus one cannot understand evolution without understanding its fundamental relation to development of the embryo." Wolpert noted that Carroll intended to explain evo-devo, and "has brilliantly achieved what he set out to do."

The evolutionary biologist Jerry Coyne, writing in Nature, described the book as being aimed at the interested lay reader, and called it "a paean to recent advances in developmental genetics, and what they may tell us about the evolutionary process." For him, the centrepiece was "the unexpected discovery that the genes that control the body plans of all bilateral animals, including worms, insects, frogs and humans, are largely identical. These are the 'homeobox' (Hox) genes". He called Carroll a leader in the field and an "adept communicator", but admits to "feeling uncomfortable" when Carroll sets out his personal vision of the field "without admitting that large parts of that vision remain controversial." Coyne pointed out that the idea that the "'regulatory gene' is the locus of evolution" dates back to Roy Britten and colleagues around 1970, but was still weakly supported by observation or experiment. He granted that chimps and humans are almost 99% identical at DNA level, but points out that "humans and chimps have different amino-acid sequences in at least 55% of their proteins, a figure that rises to 95% for humans and mice. Thus we can't exclude protein-sequence evolution as an important reason why we lack whiskers and tails." He also noted that nearly half of human protein-coding genes do not have homologues in fruit flies, so one could argue the opposite of Carroll's thesis and claim that "evolution of form is very much a matter of teaching old genes to make new genes."

The review in BioScience noted that the book serves as a new Just So Stories, explaining the "spots, stripes, and bumps" that had attracted Rudyard Kipling's attention in his children's stories. The review praised Carroll for tackling human evolution and covering the key concepts of what Charles Darwin called the grandeur of [the evolutionary view of] life, suggesting that "Kipling would be riveted."

The science writer Peter Forbes, writing in The Guardian, called it an "essential book" and its author "both a distinguished scientist ... and one of our great science writers."

The paleobiologist Douglas H. Erwin, reviewing the book for Artificial Life, noted that life forms from fruit flies to humans have far fewer genes than many biologists expected – human beings have only some 20,000. "How could humans, in all our diversity of cell types and complexity of neurons, require essentially the same number of genes as a fly, or worse, a worm (the nematode Caenorhabditis elegans)?" asks Erwin. He answered his own question about the "astonishing morphological diversity" of animals coming from "such a limited number of genes", praising Carroll's "insightful and enthusiastic" style, writing in a "witty and engaging" way, pulling the reader into the complexities of Hox and PAX-6, as well as celebrating the Cambrian explosion of life forms and much else.

== See also ==
- How the Snake Lost its Legs (Lewis I. Held, Jr., 2014)
