= Just So Stories =

1902 short story collection by Rudyard Kipling

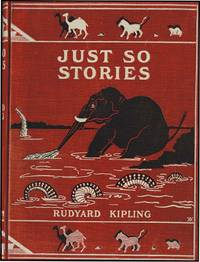
- First edition
- Author: Rudyard Kipling
- Illustrator: Rudyard Kipling
- Language: English
- Genre: Children's book
- Publisher: Macmillan
- Publication date: 1902
- Publication place: United Kingdom

Just So Stories for Little Children is a 1902 collection of origin stories by the British author Rudyard Kipling. Considered a classic of children's literature, the book is among Kipling's best known works.

Kipling began working on the book by telling the first three chapters as bedtime stories to his daughter Josephine. These had to be told "just so" (exactly in the words she was used to) or she would complain. The stories illustrate how animals acquired their distinctive features, such as how the leopard got his spots. For the book, Kipling illustrated the stories himself.

The stories have appeared in a variety of adaptations including a musical and animated films. Evolutionary biologists have noted that what Kipling did in fiction in a Lamarckian way, they have done in reality, providing Darwinian explanations for the evolutionary development of animal features.

== Context ==
The stories, first published in 1902, are origin stories, fantastic accounts of how various features of animals came to be. A forerunner of these stories is Kipling's "How Fear Came", in The Second Jungle Book (1895). In it, Mowgli hears the story of how the tiger got his stripes.

== Book ==
=== Approach ===
The Just So Stories began as bedtime stories told by Kipling to his daughter "Effie" (Josephine, Kipling's firstborn); when the first three were published in a children's magazine, a year before her death, Kipling explained: "in the evening there were stories meant to put Effie to sleep, and you were not allowed to alter those by one single little word. They had to be told just so; or Effie would wake up and put back the missing sentence. So at last they came to be like charms, all three of them – the whale tale, the camel tale, and the rhinoceros tale."

(The name Effie does not appear in the text of the stories, where the narrator now and again says O my Best Beloved to his listening child instead.)

Nine of the thirteen Just So Stories tell how particular animals were modified from their original forms to their current forms by the acts of human beings or magical beings. For example, the Whale has a tiny throat because he swallowed a mariner, who tied a raft inside to block the whale from swallowing other men. The Camel has a hump given to him by a djinn as punishment for the camel's refusing to work (the hump allows the camel to work longer between times of eating). The Leopard's spots were painted by an Ethiopian (after the Ethiopian painted himself black). The Kangaroo gets its powerful hind legs, long tail and hopping gait after being chased all day by a dingo, sent by a minor god responding to the Kangaroo's request to be made different from all other animals.

=== Contents ===
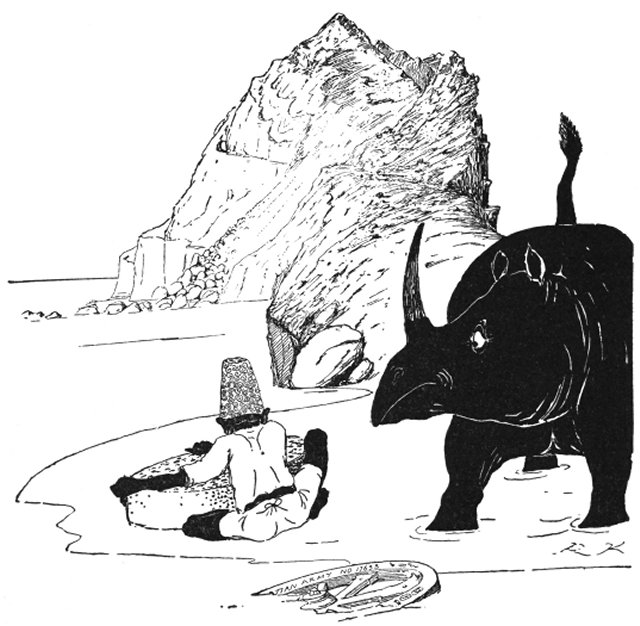
How the Rhinoceros Got His Skin, woodcut by Kipling

1. "How the Whale Got His Throat" – why the larger whales eat only small prey.
2. "How the Camel Got His Hump" – how the idle camel was punished and given a hump.
3. "How the Rhinoceros Got His Skin" – why rhinos have folds in their skin and bad tempers.
4. "How the Leopard Got His Spots" – why leopards have spots.
5. "The Elephant's Child/How the Elephant Got His Trunk" – how the elephant's trunk became long.
6. "The Sing-Song of Old Man Kangaroo" – how the kangaroo assumed long legs and tail.
7. "The Beginning of the Armadillos" – how a hedgehog and tortoise transformed into the first armadillos.
8. "How the First Letter Was Written" – introduces the only characters who appear in more than one story: a family of cave-people, called Tegumai Bopsulai (the father), Teshumai Tewindrow (the mother), and Taffimai Metallumai, shortened to Taffy, (the daughter), and explains how Taffy delivered a picture message to her mother.
9. "How the Alphabet Was Made" – tells how Taffy and her father invent an alphabet.
10. "The Crab that Played with the Sea" – a genesis story which explains the ebb and flow of the tides.
11. "The Cat that Walked by Himself" – explains how man domesticated all the wild animals, even the cat, which insisted on greater independence.
12. "The Butterfly that Stamped" – how Solomon saved the pride of a butterfly, and the Queen of Sheba used this to prevent his wives from scolding him.
13. "The Tabu Tale" – how Taffy learnt all the taboos. (Missing from most British editions; first appeared in the Scribner edition in the U.S. in 1903).

=== Illustrations ===
Kipling illustrated the original editions of the Just So Stories. Later illustrators of the book include Joseph M. Gleeson.

=== Editions ===
As well as appearing in a collection, the individual stories have also been published as separate books: often in large-format, illustrated editions for younger children.

== Adaptations ==
Adaptations of Just So Stories have been made in forms such as cartoons, including several in the Soviet Union in the 1930s, and musicals, including one in 1984 by Anthony Drewe and George Stiles.

== Reception ==
=== Contemporary ===
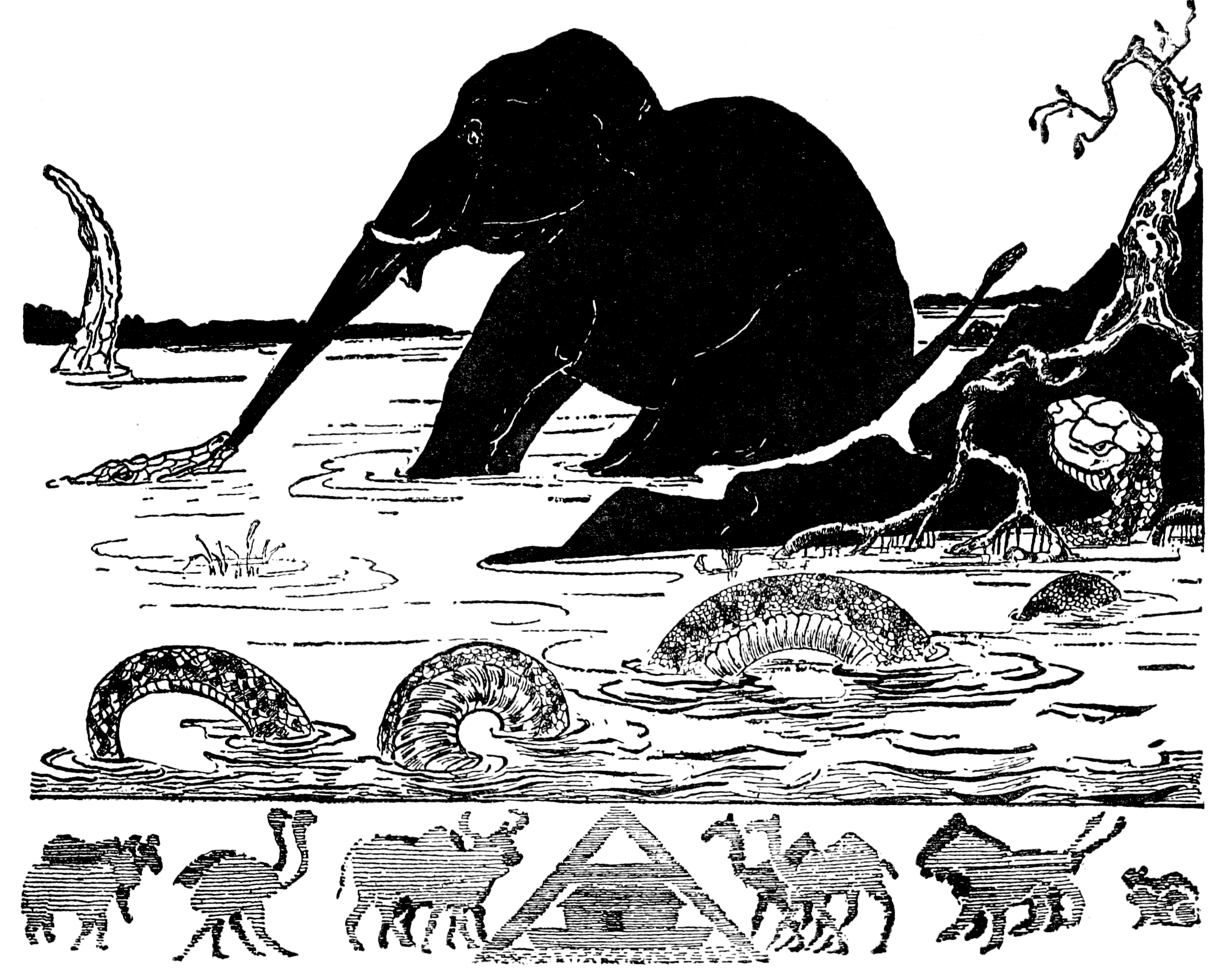
"How the Elephant Got His Trunk"

H. W. Boynton, writing in The Atlantic in 1903, commented that only a century earlier children had had to be content with the Bible, Pilgrim's Progress, Paradise Lost, and Foxe's Book of Martyrs. But in his day "A much pleasanter bill of fare is being provided for them". Boynton argued that with Just So Stories, Kipling did for "very little children" what The Jungle Book had done for older ones. He described the book as "artfully artless, in its themes, in its repetitions, in its habitual limitation, and occasional abeyance, of adult humor. It strikes a child as the kind of yarn his father or uncle might have spun if he had just happened to think of it; and it has, like all good fairy-business, a sound core of philosophy".

=== Modern ===
John Lee described the book as a classic work of children's literature. Sue Walsh observed in 2007 that critics have rigidly categorised Just So Stories as "Children's Literature", and have in consequence given it scant literary attention. In her view, if critics mention the book at all, they talk about what kind of reading is good for children and what they are capable of understanding. The stories are discussed, she argues, by critics such as Elliott Gose "in terms of ideas about the child’s pleasure (conceived of in sensual terms divorced of intellectual understanding) in the oral aspects of the text which are said to prompt an ‘active Participation’ which seems largely to be understood in terms of the ‘oral savouring’ of repetition".

=== Evolutionary developmental biology ===
The molecular biologist Walter M. Fitch remarked in 2012 (published posthumously) that the stories, while "delightful", are "very Lamarckian", giving the example of the stretching of the elephant's snout in a tug-of-war, as the acquired trait (a long trunk) is inherited by all the elephant's descendants. Lewis I. Held's 2014 account of evolutionary developmental biology ("evo-devo"), How the Snake Lost its Legs: Curious Tales from the Frontier of Evo-Devo, noted that while Kipling's Just So Stories "offered fabulous tales about how the leopard got its spots, how the elephant got its trunk, and so forth [and] remains one of the most popular children's books of all time", fables "are poor substitutes for real understanding." Held aimed "to blend Darwin's rigor with Kipling's whimsy", naming the many "Curious Tales" such as "How the Duck Got its Bill" in his book in the style of Just So Stories, and observing that truth could be stranger than fiction. Sean B. Carroll's 2005 book Endless Forms Most Beautiful has been called a new Just So Stories, one that explains the "spots, stripes, and bumps" that had attracted Kipling's attention in his children's stories. A reviewer in BioScience suggested that "Kipling would be riveted."

== See also ==
- Just So Songs
- Just-so story
- The Jungle Book
