= The Making of the Fittest =

2006 book by Sean B. Carroll

- Author: Sean B. Carroll
- Language: English
- Genre: Non-fiction
- Published: 2006
- Publisher: W. W. Norton & Company
- Publication place: USA
- Pages: 301 p., [8] p. of plates : ill. (some col.), maps; 25 cm.
- Awards: Phi Beta Kappa Award in Science
- ISBN: 978-0-393-33051-9
- Dewey Decimal: 572.8/6
- LC Class: QP624 .C37 2006
- Preceded by: Endless Forms Most Beautiful
- Followed by: Into the Jungle
- Website: http://books.wwnorton.com/books/The-Making-of-the-Fittest/

The Making of the Fittest: DNA and the Ultimate Forensic Record of Evolution is a science book by Sean B. Carroll, published in 2006. It is a general interest book on evolution, following on his two previous works Endless Forms Most Beautiful and From DNA to Diversity (an introductory text for biology graduate students). Carroll discusses specific examples of how evolutionary processes have played out in the development of selected species, and focuses on the pivotal function of changes in DNA sequences for understanding the history of natural selection. The book won the Phi Beta Kappa Award in Science.

== Contents ==
Preface: Beyond Any Reasonable Doubt discusses the nature of DNA evidence.

Introduction: The Bloodless Fish of Bouvet Island describes the evolution of antifreeze protein in icefish.

The Everyday Math of Evolution looks at work in population genetics by William E. Castle, R. C. Punnett, H. T. J. Norton, J. B. S. Haldane and others. He emphasizes that natural selection, by its nature, is cumulative and nonrandom: “The mutational process is blind, natural selection is not. Mutation generates random variation, selection sorts out the winners and losers. Furthermore, natural selection acts cumulatively."

Immortal Genes: Running in Place for Eons discusses conserved sequences. Since the genetic code is degenerate, some mutations result in codons that code for the same amino acid. Such synonymous substitutions are far less likely to be conserved by natural selection.

Making the New from the Old describes gene duplication, particularly in the evolution of color vision in primates. The insertion of Long interspersed nuclear elements and Short interspersed nuclear elements allow us to construct phylogenetic trees: “Once a SINE or a LINE is inserted, there is no active mechanism for removing it. The insertion of these elements marks a gene in a species, and is then inherited by all species descended from it.”

Fossil Genes: The Broken Pieces of Yesterday's Life describes pseudogenes, vestiges of functional genes that were not maintained by natural selection and accumulated deleterious mutations. In the human genome, MYH16 is an example.

Déjà Vu: How and Why Evolution Repeats Itself looks at convergent evolution.

Our Flesh and Blood: Arms Races, the Human Race, and Natural Selection looks at evolutionary arms races, starting with the rough-skinned newt and garter snake. He describes Anthony Allison’s work showing that sickle cell anemia is more common in populations where malaria is endemic.

The Making and Evolution of Complexity describes Carroll’s own field of evolutionary developmental biology. He describes the evolution of the eye.

Seeing and Believing looks at the antiscientific movements Lysenkoism, chiropractic and creationism.

The Palm Trees of Wyoming looks at evolutionary ecology.

== Reception ==
A review for the National Center for Science Education by Louise Mead states that the book "should be required reading for those teetering on the edge of accepting evolution, as well as anyone interested in learning more about the great epic of life", and that it provides evocative and powerful examples of how evolution works and why it matters.

David McKinnon, writing for the Journal of Clinical Investigation, notes that the book is stylistically and conceptually similar to the works of Stephen Jay Gould, but based strongly on findings in molecular biology that were not yet available for Gould. He concluded that the book was "sufficiently comprehensive to make a good introduction to evolution for the lay reader or nonspecialist and is highly recommended".
