= Human evolutionary developmental biology =

Evolution of developmental processes in humans

Human evolutionary developmental biology or informally human evo-devo is the human-specific subset of evolutionary developmental biology. Evolutionary developmental biology is the study of the evolution of developmental processes across different organisms. It is utilized within multiple disciplines, primarily evolutionary biology and anthropology. Groundwork for the theory that "evolutionary modifications in primate development might have led to … modern humans" was laid by Geoffroy Saint-Hilaire, Ernst Haeckel, Louis Bolk, and Adolph Schultz. Evolutionary developmental biology is primarily concerned with the ways in which evolution affects development, and seeks to unravel the causes of evolutionary innovations.

The approach is relatively new, but has roots in Schultz's The physical distinctions of man, from the 1940s. Shultz urged broad comparative studies to identify uniquely human traits.

== History ==
Brian Hall traces the roots of evolutionary developmental biology in his 2012 paper on its past present and future. He begins with Darwinian evolution and Mendel's genetics, noting the tendency of the followers of both men in the early 20th century to follow separate paths and to set aside and ignore apparently inexplicable problems. Greater understanding of genotypic and phenotypic structures from the 1940s enabled the unification of evolution and genetics in the modern synthesis. Molecular biology then enabled researchers to explore the mechanisms and evolution of embryonic development in molecular detail, including in humans.

== Human and primate development ==
Many of the human evolutionary developmental biology studies have been modeled after primate studies and consider the two together in a comparative model. Brain ontogeny and human life history evolution were looked at by Leigh, in a 2006 paper. He compares brain growth patterns for Homo erectus and Homo sapiens to get at the evolution of brain size and weight. Leigh found three different patterns, all of which pointed to the growth rate of H. erectus either matching or exceeding H. erectus. He makes the case that this finding had wide application and relevance to the overall study of human evolution. It is pertinent specifically to the connections between energy expenditure and brain development. These finding are of specific utility in studies on maternal energy expenditure. Comparative study of nonhuman primates, fossils and modern humans to study patterns of brain growth to correlate human life history and brain growth.

Jeremy De Silva and Julie Lesnik examined chimpanzee neonatal brain size to identify implications for brain growth in Homo erectus. This changed the understanding of differences and similarities of post-natal brain growth in humans and chimpanzees. The study found that there was a distinction necessary between growth time and growth rate. The times of growth were strikingly similar, but the rates were not. The paper further advocates the use of fossils to assess brain size in general and in relation to cranial capacity.

Utilization of endocranial volume as a measure for brain size has been a popular methodology with the fossil record since Darwin in the mid 1800s. This measure has been used to access the metabolic requirements for brain growth and the subsequent trade-offs.

=== Neoteny ===
Some of the work on human evolutionary developmental biology has centered around the neotenous features that present in humans, but are not shared across the primate spectrum. Steven J. Gould discussed the presentation of neoteny with "terminal additions" in humans. Neoteny is defined as the delayed or slowed development in humans when compared with their non-human primate counterparts. The "terminal additions" were extensions or reductions in the rate and scope of stages of development and growth. Gould hypothesized that this process and production of neoteny in humans might be the key feature that ultimately lead to the emotional and communicative nature of humans. He credits this factor as an integral facet of human evolution. However, there have also been cautions against the application of this aspect to group ranking during it inappropriate as a measure of evolutionary achievement.

=== Fossil record ===
Early comparative and human studies examined the fossil record to measure features like cranial sizes and capacities so as to infer brain size, growth rate, total growth and potential implications for energy expenditure. Helpful as this is, the static nature of individual fossils presents its own challenge. The phylogenic fossil line is itself a hypothesis, so anything based upon it is equally hypothetical.

Using the fossil record of Neanderthals, modern humans, and chimpanzees, Gunz et al. examined that patterns of endocranial development. They found that there are common features shared between the three, and that modern humans diverge from these common patterns in the first year of life. They concluded that even though much of the developmental results are similar insofar as brain size, the trajectories by which they arrived are not shared. Most of the differences between the two arise post-natally, in the first year, with cognitive development.

There have been a number of studies that not only take incomplete fossil records into consideration, but have attempted to specifically identify the barriers presented by this condition. For example, Kieran McNulty covers the potential utilities and constraints of using incomplete fossil taxa to examine longitudinal development in Australopithecus africanis.

Many studies on development have been human-specific. In his 2011 paper, Bernard Crespi focused on adaptation and genomic conflict in childhood diseases. He considers the evolution of childhood diseases and their risk levels, and finds that both risk and disease have evolved.

Hotchberg and Belsky incorporate a life-history perspective, looking at adolescence. Substantial variation in phenotypic paths and presentations suggest significant environmental influence. They focus on plasticity between stages of development and the factors that shape it. Rate of maturation, fecundity, and fertility were all impacted by environmental circumstances. They argue that early maturation can be positive, reflecting opportunistic actions within specific conditions.

== Genetic and epigenetic basis ==
Technological advances that have allowed better and better access to the growth of the human form in utero have proven particularly formative in studies involving focus on genetic and epigenetic development. Bakker et al. look at the interconnected nature of developmental processes and attempt to use fetal vertebral abnormalities as an indicator for other malformations. They found that the origin of the cells was not nearly as highly correlated as the observed developmental signals. In utero development and malformations were correlated in severity.

Freiston and Galis look at the development of ribs, digits, and mammalian asymmetry. They argue that this construction is relevant for the study of disease, the consistency in evolution of body plans, and understanding of developmental constraints. Sexual dimorphism in prenatal digit ratio was found as early as 14 weeks and was maintained whether or not the fleshy finger part was included.

== Language and cognitive studies ==
Languages and cognitive function have also been subjects of evolutionary studies. Insofar as language and evolutionary developmental biology, there is tension from the gate. Much of this contention has centered around whether to view and study language as an adaptation in and of itself, or as a by-product of other adaptations. Jackendoff and Pinker have argued for language as an adaptation owing to the interdependent social nature of humans. To support these claims, he points to things like the bi-directionality in language usage and comprehension. This is a counter to the claims by theorists like Noam Chomsky, who argued against language as a human specific adaptation.

Adaptation and adaptive theory has been argued even separate from its utility in the study of language. Gould and Lewontin engage with what they saw as flaws in adaptive theory using the analogy of the spandrels of San Marco. Among the issues identified is the lack of distinction between what trait developed and how it is used, and the underlying reasons or forces that created the novel trait initially. This is particularly difficult to access in intangible language and cognition.

This debate has continued over decades and most often presents in the form of a response and published dialogue between theorists. This continued debate has prompted efforts to marry the two perspectives in a useful way. Fitch argues that these two approaches can be rectified with the study of "neutral computation and mammalian brain development". It may be more useful to consider specific components of neural computation and development, what has been selected for, and to what end.

Ploeger and Galis tackled modular evolvability and developmental constraints in human and other primate evolutionary trajectories. They argue that these should be treated with an interdisciplinary approach across the cognitive sciences. They frame this in the context of:

1. Modularity — the ability of a system to organize individuals for the benefit of the whole
2. Evolvability — ability of organism or organisms to adapt through evolution
3. Developmental constraints — those things that act as barriers to evolutionary adaptations.

== See also ==
- Regulation of gene expression

== Sources ==
- Gould, Stephen Jay (1977). Ontogeny and phylogeny. Belknap Press. ISBN 978-0-674-63940-9. OCLC 728065114.
