= Urmetazoan =

Hypothetical last common ancestor of all animals

The Urmetazoan is the hypothetical last common ancestor of all animals. The name derives from metazoa, an old biological term for animals. It is universally accepted to have been a multicellular heterotroph — with the novelties of a germline and oogamy, an extracellular matrix (ECM) and basement membrane, cell-cell and cell-ECM adhesions and signaling pathways, collagen IV and fibrillar collagen, different cell types (as well as expanded gene and protein families), spatial regulation and a complex developmental plan, and relegated unicellular stages.

== Choanoflagellates ==
All animals are posited to have evolved from a flagellated eukaryote. Their closest known living relatives are the choanoflagellates, collared flagellates whose cell morphology is similar to the choanocyte cells of certain sponges.

Molecular studies place animals in a supergroup called the opisthokonts, which also includes the choanoflagellates, fungi, and a few small parasitic protists. The name comes from the posterior location of the flagellum in motile cells, such as most animal spermatozoa, whereas other eukaryotes tend to have anterior flagella instead.

== Hypotheses ==
Several different hypotheses for the animals' last common ancestor have been suggested.

- The placula hypothesis, proposed by Otto Bütschli, holds that the last common ancestor of animals was an amorphous blob with no symmetry or axis. The center of this blob rose slightly above the silt, forming a hollow that aided feeding on the sea floor underneath. As the cavity grew deeper and deeper, the organisms resembled a thimble, with an inside and an outside. This body shape is found in sponges and cnidaria. This explanation leads to the formation of the bilaterian body plan; the urbilaterian would develop its symmetry when one end of the placula became adapted for forward movement, resulting in left-right symmetry.
- The planula hypothesis, proposed by Bütschli, suggests that metazoa are derived from planula; that is, the larva of certain cnidaria, or the adult form of the placozoans. Under this hypothesis, the larva became sexually mature through paedomorphosis, and could reproduce without passing through a sessile phase.
- The gastraea hypothesis was proposed by Ernst Haeckel in 1874, shortly after his work on the calcareous sponges. He proposed that this group of sponges is monophyletic with all eumetazoans, including the bilaterians. This suggests that the gastrulation and the gastrula stage are universal for eumetazoans. It has been perceived as problematic that gastrulation by invagination is by no means universal among eumetazoans. Only recently has an invagination been confirmed in a Calcarea sponge, albeit too early to form a remaining inner space (archenteron).
- The bilaterogastraea hypothesis was developed by Gösta Jägersten as an adaptation of Ernst Haeckel's Gastraea hypothesis. He proposed that the Bilaterogastraea have a two-stage life cycle, with a pelagic juvenile and a benthic adult stage. The invagination of the original gastrula stage he saw as bilaterally symmetric rather than radially symmetric.
- The choanoflagellate hypothesis was proposed by Élie Metchnikoff in the 1880s. In this model, single cell flagellates combine into a colony like sponges. Evolutionary advantages of the colony form lead to more complex shapes. The concept has been elaborated in the 20th century as the Choanoblastaea model.

== See also ==
- Evolution of nervous systems – Origin and subsequent variation and development of neurons and neural tissues and organs
- Ikaria wariootia – Early bilaterian organism fossil species
- LUCA – Ancestor of all current life on Earth
- Mitochondrial Eve – Matrilineal most recent common ancestor of all living humans
- Organism – Individual living life form
- Outline of biology
- Outline of life forms – Overview of and topical guide to life forms
- Timeline of the evolutionary history of life
- Urbilaterian – Possible simple urbilateran candidate
