= Facilitated variation =

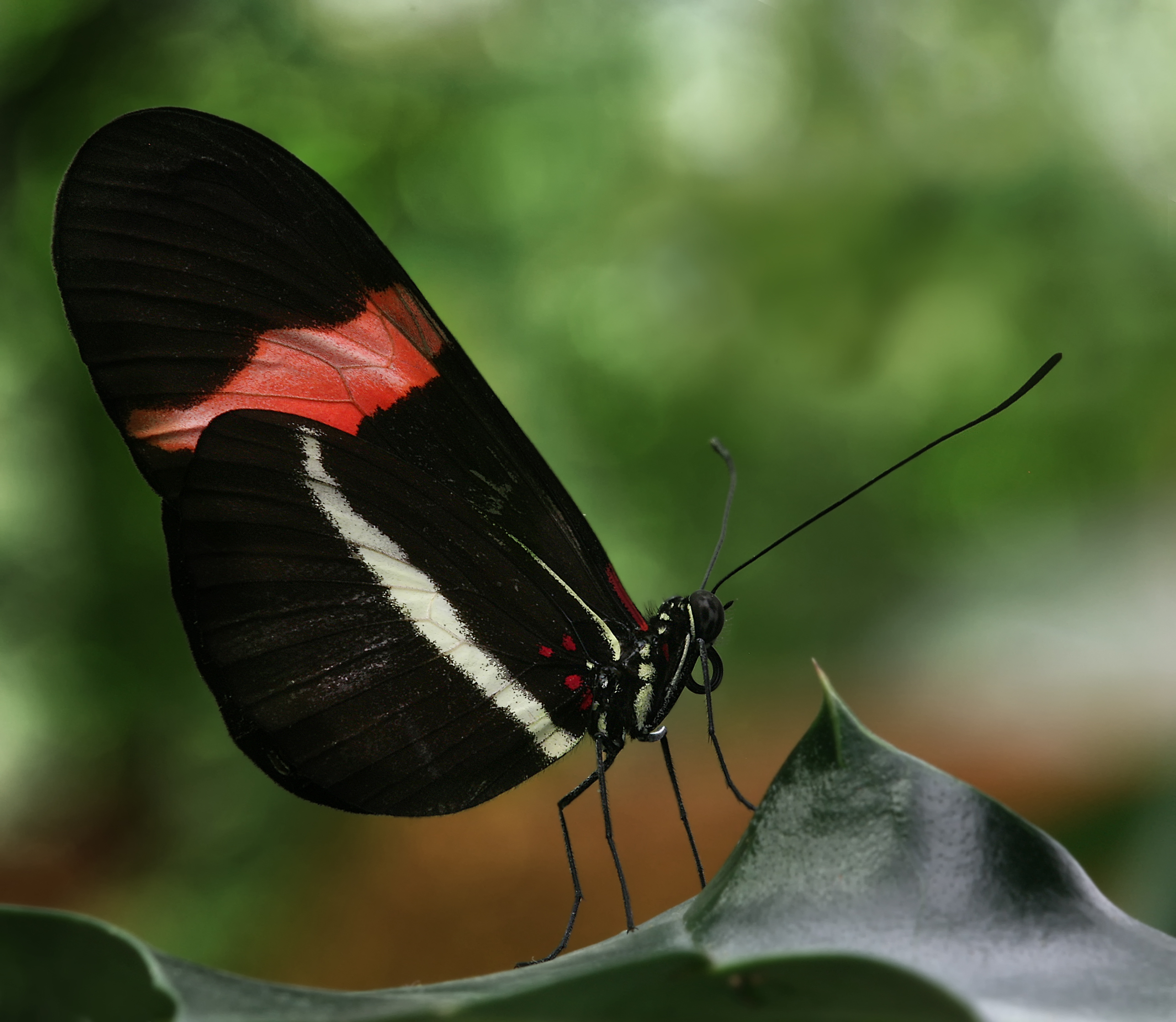
Heliconius erato Different species of Heliconius butterfly have independently evolved similar patterns, apparently both facilitated and constrained by the available developmental-genetic toolkit genes controlling wing pattern formation.

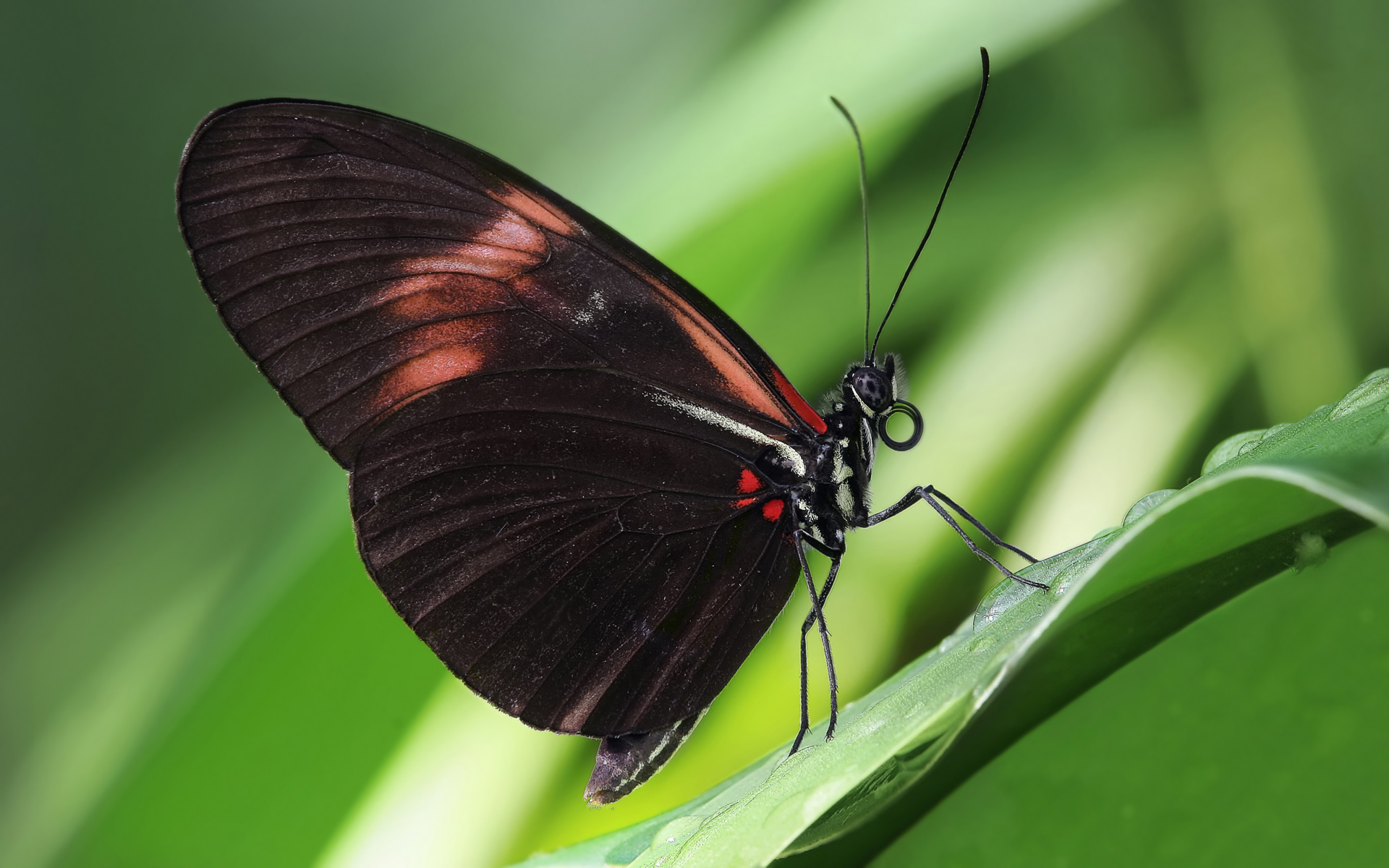
Heliconius melpomene

The theory of facilitated variation demonstrates how seemingly complex biological systems can arise through a limited number of regulatory genetic changes, through the differential re-use of pre-existing developmental components. The theory was presented in 2005 by Marc W. Kirschner (a professor and chair at the Department of Systems Biology, Harvard Medical School) and John C. Gerhart (a professor at the Graduate School, University of California, Berkeley).

The theory of facilitated variation addresses the nature and function of phenotypic variation in evolution. Recent advances in cellular and evolutionary developmental biology shed light on a number of mechanisms for generating novelty. Most anatomical and physiological traits that have evolved since the Cambrian are, according to Kirschner and Gerhart, the result of regulatory changes in the usage of various conserved core components that function in development and physiology. Novel traits arise as novel packages of modular core components, which requires modest genetic change in regulatory elements. The modularity and adaptability of developmental systems reduces the number of regulatory changes needed to generate adaptive phenotypic variation, increases the probability that genetic mutation will be viable, and allows organisms to respond flexibly to novel environments. In this manner, the conserved core processes facilitate the generation of adaptive phenotypic variation, which natural selection subsequently propagates.

== Description of the theory ==
The theory of facilitated variation consists of several elements. Organisms are built from a set of highly conserved modules called "core processes" that function in development and physiology, and have remained largely unchanged for millions (in some instances billions) of years. Genetic mutation leads to regulatory changes in the package of core components (i.e. new combinations, amounts, and functional states of those components) exhibited by an organism. Finally, the altered combinations, amounts, and states of the conserved components function to develop and operate a new trait on which natural selection acts. Because of their modular organization, adaptability (e.g. arising through exploratory processes) and compartmentation, developmental systems tend to produce facilitated (i.e. functional and adaptive) phenotypic variation when challenged by genetic mutation or novel environmental conditions.

=== Conserved core components ===
Animals are built from a tool kit of components (e.g. like lego bricks). Most of the core components are conserved across diverse phyla of the animal kingdom. Examples of core components are:

- DNA replication,
- DNA transcription to RNA,
- translation of RNA to protein,
- formation of microfilament and microtubule cytoskeletons,
- cell–cell signaling pathways,
- cell adhesion processes,
- anteroposterior axis formation

Additional core processes, such as appendage and limb formation in arthropods and tetrapods, respectively, are combinations of different conserved core processes linked in new regulatory configurations, and conserved in their entirety.

=== Weak regulatory linkage ===
Different core processes become linked, through differential regulation, in different combinations, and operate in different amounts, states, times, and places, to generate new anatomical and physiological traits. These regulatory linkages can be made and changed easily, a phenomenon that Kirschner and Gerhart call "weak regulatory linkage". Regulatory signals can switch on and off the core components to elicit complex responses. Although the signal seems to control the response, typically the responding core process can produce the output by itself but inhibits itself from doing so. All the signal does is interfere with this self-inhibition. Regulatory change is easily effected because conserved core processes have switch-like behavior and alternative outputs already built into them, which means that regulation does not need to coevolve with the functional output.

=== Exploratory processes ===
Some conserved core processes, called "exploratory processes", have the ability to generate many different phenotypical outcomes or states. Examples include:

- the formation of microtubule structures,
- the development of the nervous system (i.e. connecting of axons and target organs),
- synapse elimination,
- muscle patterning,
- the production of blood vessels,
- vertebrate immune system,
- animal learning

Exploratory processes first generate a very large amount of physiological variation, often at random, and then select or stabilize the most useful ones, with the rest disappearing or dying back. Hence, exploratory processes resemble a Darwinian process operating during development.

For example, as the vascular system develops, blood vessels expand to regions with insufficient oxygen supply. There is no predetermined genetically specified map for the distribution of blood vessels in the body, but the vascular system responds to signals from hypoxic tissues, whilst unrequired vessels in well-oxygenated tissues die back. Exploratory processes are powerful because they provide organisms with a tremendous scope for adaptation.

=== Compartmentation ===
Ancient regulatory processes (evolved in pre-Cambrian animals) allow the re-use of core processes in different combinations, amounts, and states in some regions of the body, or certain times in development, while decreasing their chances of generating disruptive or maladaptive pleiotropic effects elsewhere in the organism. Spatial compartmentation of transcriptional regulation and cell–cell signaling are examples. The vertebrate embryo is organized spatially into perhaps 200 compartments, each uniquely defined by its expression of one or a few key genes encoding transcription factors or signaling molecules. An example of compartmentation is found in the developing spine: all vertebrae contain bone-forming cells, but those in the chest form ribs, whereas those in the neck do not, because they arose in different compartments (expressing different Hox genes). Other forms of regulatory compartmentation include different cell types, developmental stages, and sexes.

== Example: evolution of the wing ==
Gerhart and Kirschner give the example of the evolution of a bird or bat wing from a tetrapod forelimb. They explain how, if bones undergo regulatory change in length and thickness as a result of genetic mutation, the muscles, nerves and vasculature will accommodate to those changes without themselves requiring independent regulatory change. Studies of limb development show that muscle, nerve, and vascular founder cells originate in the embryonic trunk and migrate into the developing limb bud, which initially contains only bone and dermis precursors. Muscle precursors are adaptable; they receive signals from developing dermis and bone and take positions relative to them, wherever they are. Then, as noted previously, axons in large numbers extend into the bud from the nerve cord; some fortuitously contact muscle targets and are stabilized, and the rest shrink back. Finally, vascular progenitors enter. Wherever limb cells are hypoxic, they secrete signals that trigger nearby blood vessels to grow into their vicinity. Because of the adaptability conferred by exploratory processes, the co-evolution of bones, muscles, nerves and blood vessels is not required. Selection does not have to coordinate multiple independently varying parts. This not only means that viable phenotypes can easily be generated with little genetic change, but also that genetic mutations are less likely to be lethal, that large phenotypic changes can be favored by selection, and that phenotypic variation is functional and adaptive (i.e. 'facilitated').

== Computational analyses ==
The theory of facilitated variation is supported by computational analyses of the evolution of regulatory networks. These studies confirm that phenotypic variability can be directed towards phenotypes with high fitness even when mutations are randomly distributed, and even when challenged with novel environmental conditions. Parter et al. demonstrate how key elements of facilitated variation theory, such as weak regulatory linkage, modularity, and reduced pleiotropy of mutations, evolve spontaneously under realistic conditions.

== Facilitated variation and evolution ==
In the classical Darwinian view, a large number of successive mutations, each selected for its usefulness to the survival of the organism, is required to produce novel structures such as wings, limbs, or the brain. Alternatively, facilitated variation asserts that the physiological adaptability of core processes and properties such as weak linkage and exploratory processes enable proteins, cells, and body structures to interact in numerous ways that can lead to the creation of novelty with a limited number of genes, and a limited number of mutations.

Therefore, the role of mutations is often to change how, where, and when the genes are expressed during the development of the embryo and adult. The burden of creativity in evolution does not rest on selection alone. Through its ancient repertoire of core processes, the current phenotype of the animal determines the kind, amount, and viability of phenotypic variation the animal can produce in response to regulatory change. In emphasizing the adaptability of organisms, and their ability to produce functional phenotypes even in the face of mutation or environmental change, Kirschner and Gerhart's theory builds upon earlier ideas by James Baldwin (the Baldwin effect), Ivan Schmalhausen, Conrad Waddington (genetic assimilation and accommodation), and Mary Jane West-Eberhard ('genes are followers not leaders'). More recently, the theory of facilitated variation has been embraced by advocates of an extended evolutionary synthesis, and emphasized for its role in generating non-random phenotypic variation ('developmental bias'). However, some evolutionary biologists remain skeptical as to whether facilitated variation adds a great deal to evolutionary theory.

== Refutation of Intelligent Design ==
Creationists and advocates of Intelligent Design have argued that complex traits cannot evolve through successive small modifications to pre-existing functional systems. The theory of facilitated variation challenges this idea of irreducible complexity by explaining how random mutation can cause substantial and adaptive changes within a species. It explains how the individual organism can change from a passive target of natural selection, to an active player in the 3-billion-year history of evolution. Kirschner and Gerhart's theory thereby provides a scientific rebuttal to modern critics of evolution who champion Intelligent Design.

== See also ==
- Evolvability
- Constructive development (biology)
- Extended evolutionary synthesis
