= Urbilaterian =

Possible simple urbilateran candidate

Phylogenetic position of the urbilaterian

- Urbilaterian ↓
  - Xenacoelomorpha
  - Nephrozoa ↓
    - Protostomes
      - Spiralia
      - Ecdysozoa
    - Deuterostomes

The urbilaterian (from German ur- 'original') is the unattested last common ancestor of the bilaterian clade, i.e., all animals having a bilateral symmetry.

== Appearance ==
Its appearance is a matter of debate, since no representative has been (or may ever be) identified in the fossil record. Two reconstructed urbilaterian morphologies can be considered: first, the less complex ancestral form forming the common ancestor to Xenacoelomorpha and Nephrozoa; and second, the more complex (coelomate) urbilaterian ancestral to both protostomes and deuterostomes, sometimes referred to as the "urnephrozoan". Since most protostomes and deuterostomes share features — e.g. nephridia (and the derived kidneys), through guts, blood vessels and nerve ganglia— that are useful only in relatively large (macroscopic) organisms, their common ancestor ought also to have been macroscopic. However, such large animals should have left traces in the sediment in which they moved, and evidence of such traces first appear relatively late in the fossil record — long after the urbilaterian would have lived. This leads to suggestions of a small urbilaterian (around 1 mm), which is the supposed state of the ancestor of protostomes, deuterostomes and acoelomorphs.

== Dating the urbilaterian ==
The first evidence of bilateria in the fossil record comes from trace fossils in sediments towards the end of the Ediacaran period (about 570 million years ago), and the first fully accepted fossil of a bilaterian organism is Kimberella, dating to 555 million years ago. There are earlier, controversial fossils: Vernanimalcula has been interpreted as a bilaterian, but may simply represent a fortuitously infilled bubble. Fossil embryos are known from around the time of Vernanimalcula (580 million years ago), but none of these have bilaterian affinities. This may reflect a genuine absence of bilateria; however, it is likely this is not the case as bilateria may not have laid their eggs in sediment, where they would be likely to fossilise.

Molecular techniques can generate expected dates of the divergence between the bilaterian clades, and thus an assessment of when the urbilaterian lived. These dates have huge margins of error, though they are becoming more accurate with time. More recent estimates are compatible with an Ediacaran bilaterian, although it is possible, especially if early bilaterians were small, that the bilateria had a long cryptic history before they left any evidence in the fossil record.

== Characteristics of the urbilaterian ==
=== Eyes ===
Light detection (photosensitivity) is present in organisms as simple as seaweeds; the definition of a true eye varies, but in general eyes must have directional sensitivity, and thus have screening pigments so only light from the target direction is detected. Thus defined, they need not consist of more than one photoreceptor cell.

The presence of genetic machinery (the Pax6 and Six genes) common to eye formation in all bilaterians suggests that this machinery - and hence eyes - was present in the urbilaterian. The most likely candidate eye type is the simple pigment-cup eye, which is the most widespread among the bilateria.

Since two types of opsin, the c-type and r-type, are found in all bilaterians, the urbilaterian must have possessed both types - although they may not have been found in a centralised eye, but used to synchronise the body clock to daily or lunar variations in lighting.

== Complexity ==
Proponents of a complex urbilaterian point to the shared features and genetic machinery common to all bilateria. They argue that (1) since these are similar in so many respects, they could have evolved only once; and (2) since they are common to all bilateria, they must have been present in the ancestral bilaterian animal.

However, as biologists' understanding of the major bilaterian lineages increases, it is beginning to appear that some of these features may have evolved independently in each lineage. Further, the bilaterian clade has recently been expanded to include the acoelomorphs — a group of relatively simple flatworms. This lineage lacks key bilaterian features, and if it truly does reside within the bilaterian "family", many of the features listed above are no longer common to all bilateria. Instead, some features — such as segmentation and possession of a heart — are restricted to a sub-set of the bilateria, the deuterostomes and protostomes. Their last common ancestor would still have to be large and complex, but the bilaterian ancestor could be much simpler. However, some scientists stop short of including the acoelomorph clade in the bilateria. This shifts the position of the cladistic node that is being discussed; consequently, the urbilaterian in this context is farther out of the evolutionary tree and is more derived than the common ancestor of deuterostomes, protostomes and acoelomorphs.

Genetic reconstructions are unfortunately not much help. They work by considering the genes common to all bilateria, but problems arise because very similar genes can be co-opted for different functions. For instance, the gene Pax6 has a function in eye development, but is absent in some animals with eyes; some cnidaria have genes that, in bilateria, control the development of a layer of cells that the cnidaria do not have. This means that, even if a gene can be identified as present in the urbilaterian, we cannot necessary tell what the gene's function was. Before this was realised, genetic reconstructions implied an implausibly complex urbilaterian.

The evolutionary developmental biologist Lewis Held notes that both centipedes and snakes use the oscillating mechanism based on the Notch signaling pathway to produce segments from the growing tip at the rear of the embryo. Further, both groups make use of "the obtuse process of 'resegmentation', whereby the phase of their metameres shifts by half a unit of wavelength, i.e. somites splitting to make vertebrae or parasegments splitting to form segments." Held comments that all this makes it difficult to imagine that their urbilaterian common ancestor was not segmented.

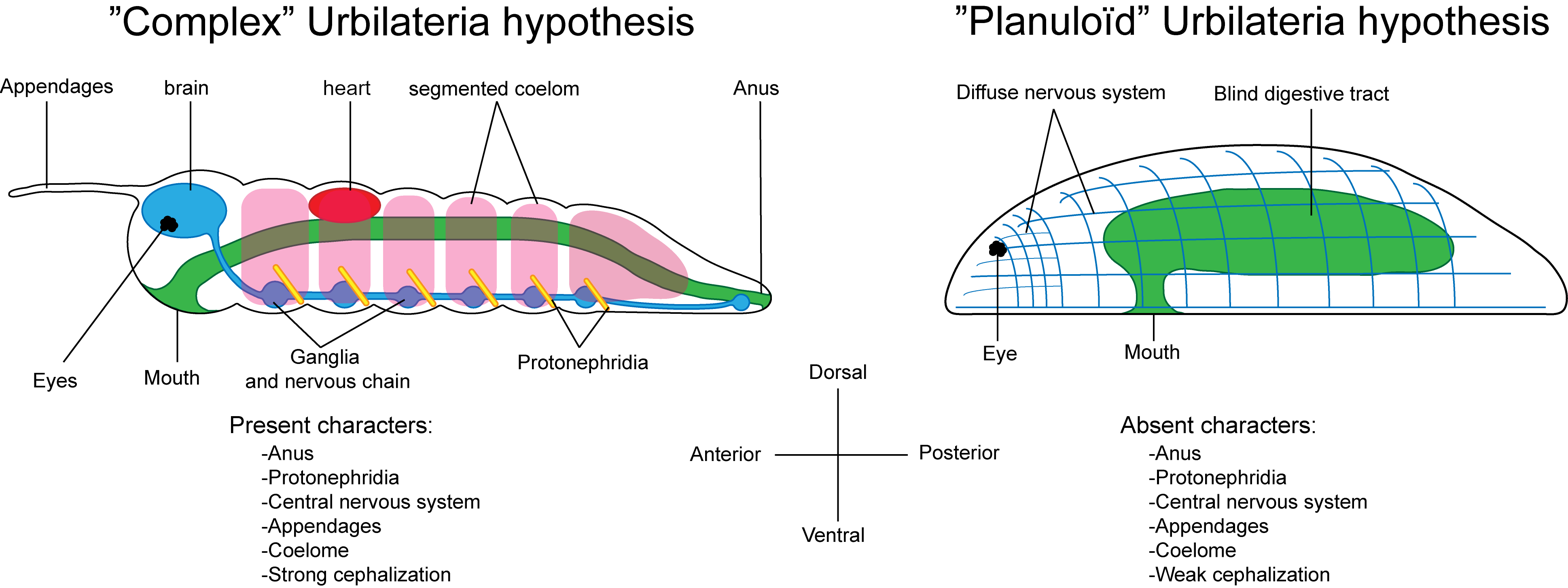
Two hypotheses of the different characters and organ systems of the urbilaterian: the "complex" and "planula-like" urbilaterian. None of these representations shows an animal that existed or exists, and different combinations of these two organisms can be proposed by some authors (for example, an unsegmented urbilaterian with a centralized nervous system). These two representations are only two "extremes" of different hypotheses.

== Reconstructing the urbilaterian ==
The absence of a fossil record gives a starting point for the reconstruction — the urbilaterian must have been small enough not to leave any traces as it moved over or lived in the sediment surface. This means it must have been well below a centimetre in length. As all Cambrian animals are marine, one can reasonably assume that the urbilaterian was too.

Furthermore, a reconstruction of the urbilateria must rest on identifying morphological similarities between all bilateria. While some bilateria live attached to a substrate, this appears to be a secondary adaptation, and the urbilaterian was probably mobile. Its nervous system was probably dispersed, but with a small central "brain". Since acoelomorphs lack a heart, coelom or organs, the urbilaterian probably did too — it would presumably have been small enough for diffusion to do the job of transporting compounds through the body. A small, narrow gut was probably present, which would have had only one opening — a combined mouth and anus. Functional considerations suggest that the surface of the bilaterian was probably covered with cilia, which it could have used for locomotion or feeding.

As of 2018, there is still no consensus on whether the characteristics of the deuterostomes and protostomes evolved once or many times. Features such as a heart and a blood-circulation system may therefore not have been present even in the deuterostome-protostome ancestor, which would mean that this too could have been small (hence explaining the lack of fossil record).

== Possible models of the Urbilaterian ==
It is possible that the common ancestor of all bilaterals looked similar to:

=== Colonial-Pennatulacean hypothesis: (Colonialy fusion of cnidarian-like) ===
The proposal that bilaterals arose from the fusion between pennatulacean-like cnidarian zooids was granted by Dewel, implies that the body plans of bilaterals originated from a colonial ancestor.

This proposal has little or no support in the existing data, and has been commonly used as a justification against the sedentary/semi-sedentary models of urbilaterians as a whole.

=== Cloudinomorpha hypothesis: (Biphasic Sedentary sessile adult and Pelagic larvae) ===
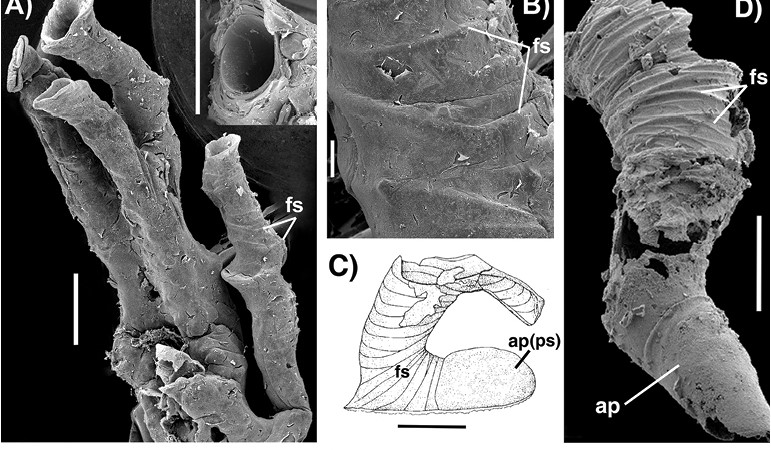
Presence of an embryonic structure similar to a protoconch (embryonic dome) in Cloudinidae and Pterobranchia, this structure along with other characteristics could have been present in the common ancestor of the bilaterals.

The recent model by Alexander V. Martynov and Tatiana A. Korshunova revives the idea of a sessile sedentary biphasic ancestor.

This proposes that the urbilaterian is an organism whose adult life is sessile-sedentary with a juvenile or free and pelagic larval phase. This hypothesis is a derivative of Claus Nielsen's larval hypothesis, but now also considering the homology of the adult forms of choanozoans (except Ctenophora). It also considers various phylogenetic, paleontological and molecular data, relates the adult and ancestral form of anthozoans (from which jellyfish, placozoans, nephrozoans, and perhaps proarticulates are derived), in turn derived from an ancestral organization shared between choanoflagellates, sponges and parahoxozoans.

This argues that theories involving a mobile urbilaterian cause problems with palaeontological and morphological data in relation to groups within and outside Bilateria.

So members of Proarticulata are an evolutionary dead end rather than the ancestors of nephrozoans. It is possible that the Cloudinids (Cloudina, Conotubus and Multiconotubus) are basal (and therefore bilateral) nephrozoans, because they have considerable similarity with the tubariums of sedentary pterobranchs, as well as with the shells of semi-mobile hyoliths and mobile mollusks, this taking into account the ontogeny of the cloudinids.

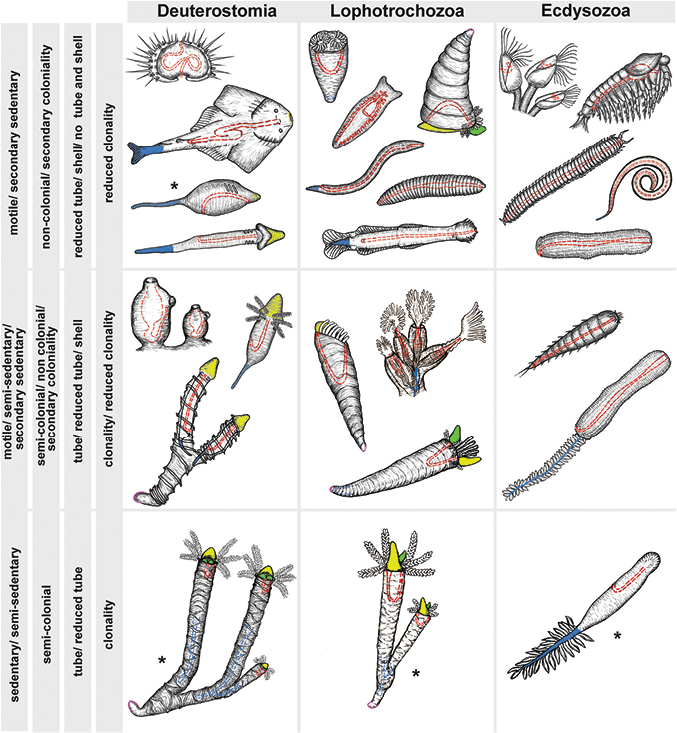
Potential homology between nephrozoans through a sedentary-pelagic ancestor, among which the embryonic structure similar to a protoconch (violet), the digestive tube (red), the stolon and tail (blue), the head shield and potential derivatives (yellow), and the oral lobes (green).

This implies that the Cloudinomorpha is not a polyphyletic group as would have been proposed but rather is a paraphyletic grade from which several taxa derive that may or may not conserve the ancestral clonality of basal metazoans, but instead of cloudinids having an annelid-type gut, it would instead be a U-shaped digestive tube, in fact the relationship between Cloudina and annelids is denied.

The hypothesis of annelid-like ancestor is rejected, due to the independent evolution of segmentation and complete metamerism of several groups of bilaterians (annelids, panarthropods, chordates and proarticulates); On the other hand, the urbilaterian would be an animal with a U-shaped gut, with deuterostomic characteristics that hemichordates and lophophorates among other groups conserve, a stolon that holds the organism inside a tube secreted from the embryonic form as a dome or protoconch, a semi-metamerism derived from the formation of mesoderm from the gastrovascular cavity of an anthozoan-like animal.

This form of urbilaterian:

- Smooths the transition between anthozoan-like polypoids and various groups of bilaterians.
- Takes into account the paraphyly of Cycloneuralia, Lophophorata and potentially Deuterostomia.
- The basal location of priapulids among ecdysozoans. Followed by the zero similarity between the priapulids with the cephalozoans that at the time were pointed out as ancestors of the arthropods.
- The hastily rejected possible homology of ambulacrarian, bryozoan and brachiozoan tentacles.
- The qualities of the common ancestor of mollusks as an animal with a single shell rather than a qiton-like animal.
- The location of basal polychaetes such as Oweniidae with still conserved deuterostome characteristics.
- The similarities between hyoliths and mollusks.
- The derived and non-ancestral position of the annelids, flatworms and perhaps the xenacoelomorphs.

The common ancestor of modern bilaterals would then be more similar to modern pterobranchs, although they would not be completely identical to them.

The location of Ctenophora (Myriazoa hypothesis) should not change the hypothesis since it has been left aside taking only into account the molecular and morphological development of Choanoflagellatea, Porifera and Cnidaria.

== See also ==
- Caveasphaera – Possible very early animal found in ancient rocks
- Ikaria wariootia – Early bilaterian organism fossil species
- LUCA – Ancestor of all current life on Earth
- Organism – Individual living life form
- Outline of biology
- Outline of life forms – Overview of and topical guide to life forms
- Timeline of the evolutionary history of life
- Urmetazoan – Hypothetical last common ancestor of all animals
