= Sean B. Carroll =

American evolutionary developmental biologist (born 1960)

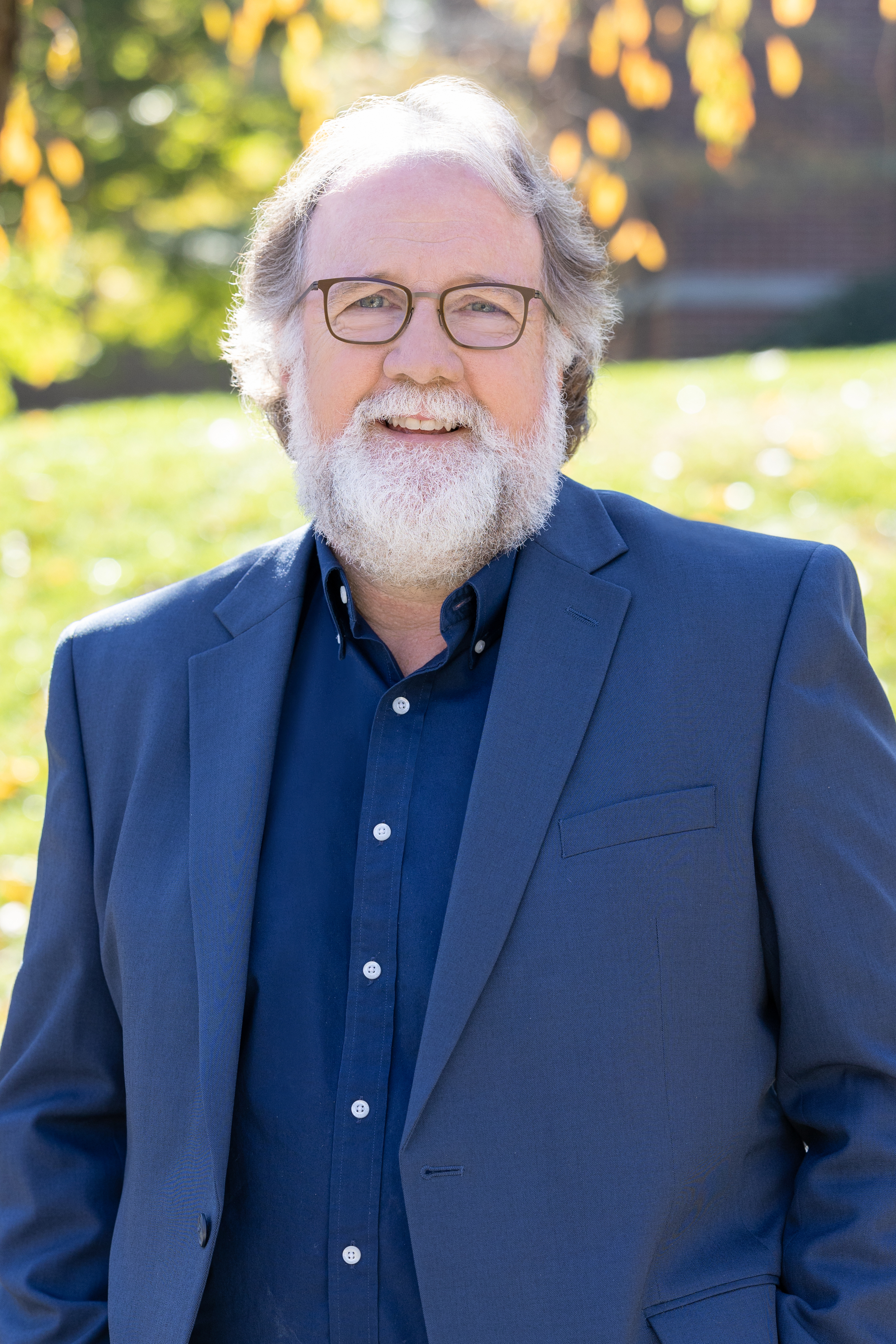
- Carroll in 2022
- Born: September 17, 1960 (age 66); Toledo, Ohio, U.S.
- Education: Washington University in St. Louis (BS); Tufts University (PhD)
- Awards: Presidential Young Investigator Award; Benjamin Franklin Medal in Life Science; Stephen Jay Gould Prize from the Society for the Study of Evolution; Distinguished Service Award from the National Association of Biology Teachers; Shaw Scientist Award from the Greater Milwaukee Foundation
- Scientific career
- Fields: Evolutionary developmental biology, molecular biology, genetics
- Workplaces: University of Maryland, University of Wisconsin–Madison, University of Colorado at Boulder
- Doctoral advisor: B. David Stollar
- Other academic advisors: Matthew P. Scott

Sean Brendan Carroll (born September 17, 1960) is an American evolutionary developmental biologist, author, educator and executive producer. He is a distinguished university professor at the University of Maryland and professor emeritus of molecular biology and genetics at the University of Wisconsin–Madison.

His studies focus on the evolution of cis-regulatory elements in the regulation of gene expression in the context of biological development, using Drosophila as a model system. He is a member of the National Academy of Sciences, of the American Philosophical Society (2007), of the American Academy of Arts and Sciences and the American Association for Advancement of Science. He is a Howard Hughes Medical Institute investigator.

Carroll has received the Stephen Jay Gould Prize from the Society for the Study of Evolution, the Benjamin Franklin Medal in Life Science, and the Lewis Thomas Prize at Rockefeller University. He has produced Emmy-winning films The Farthest and The Serengeti Rules, as well as the Oscar-nominated film All That Breathes.

== Biography ==
Sean B. Carroll was born in Toledo, Ohio. He is of Irish ancestry. He has stated that as a child he would flip over rocks looking for snakes while attending Maumee Valley Country Day School, and at age eleven or twelve, he started keeping snakes. This activity led him to notice the patterns on the snakes and wonder how those formed. He graduated from St. Francis de Sales High School in 1977. He got his B.A. in biology at Washington University in St. Louis, his Ph.D. in immunology from Tufts University and did post-doctoral work at the University of Colorado Boulder.

== Career ==
Carroll has published extensively on evolutionary developmental biology ("evo-devo"), studying the evolution of regulatory modules that specify body parts and patterns. Carroll is an investigator for the Howard Hughes Medical Institute. In 1987, Carroll set up a laboratory at the University of Wisconsin-Madison "focused on understanding how genes get used in different ways to generate the diversity of form that we see". The Laboratory of Cell and Molecular Biology lists Carroll's interests as "Genetic control of body pattern in fruit flies, butterflies, and other animals". Carroll's team has shown, in a series of papers, how the activation of genes during the embryonic stages of the Drosophila fruit fly controls the development of its wings. The team has been searching for the butterfly's counterparts of these genes.

In 2010, he was named vice-president for science education of the Howard Hughes Medical Institute. In 2011, the HHMI launched a documentary film initiative to produce science features for television, to which Carroll was appointed as one of the executive producers. In 2012, Carroll founded HHMI Tangled Bank Studios. In 2012, a film produced by this studio called The Day the Mesozoic Died retraced the investigation that led to the discovery of the asteroid collision that triggered the mass extinction at the end of that Era. The film was introduced by Carroll at a National Teacher's Conference.

Carroll was an executive producer of The Farthest, a film about the Voyager program, which won the Emmy in 2018 for outstanding science and technology documentary. Carroll was an executive producer of the 2022 Oscar-nominated documentary All That Breathes, which won the best documentary award at the Cannes Film Festival.

Carroll is a proponent of the extended evolutionary synthesis. Since 2013, Carroll has been listed on the Advisory Council of the National Center for Science Education. From September 2009 to March 2013, he wrote a column for The New York Times called "Remarkable Creatures", where he discussed findings in animal evolution.

== Awards ==
In 2009, Carroll was awarded the Viktor Hamburger Outstanding Educator Prize from the Society for Developmental Biology. In 2012, he was awarded the Benjamin Franklin Medal in Life Science from the Franklin Institute "for proposing and demonstrating that the diversity and multiplicity of animal life is largely due to the different ways that the same genes are regulated rather than to mutation of the genes themselves." In 2016, he was awarded the Lewis Thomas Prize by Rockefeller University.

== Selected works ==
=== Books ===
- From DNA to Diversity: Molecular Genetics and the Evolution of Animal Design, with Jennifer Grenier and Scott Weatherbee (2004, Wiley-Blackwell; ISBN 978-1-4051-1950-4)
- Endless Forms Most Beautiful: The New Science of Evo Devo and the Making of the Animal Kingdom (2005, W. W. Norton & Company; ISBN 978-0-393-06016-4)
- The Making of the Fittest: DNA and the Ultimate Forensic Record of Evolution (2006, W. W. Norton & Company; ISBN 978-0-393-06163-5)
- Into the Jungle: Great Adventures in the Search for Evolution (2008, Benjamin Cummings; ISBN 978-0-321-55671-4)
- Remarkable Creatures: Epic Adventures in the Search for the Origin of Species (2009, Houghton Mifflin Harcourt; ISBN 978-0-15-101485-9)
- Brave Genius: A Scientist, a Philosopher, and Their Daring Adventures from the French Resistance to the Nobel Prize (2013, Crown; ISBN 978-0-307-95233-2)
- The Serengeti Rules: The Quest to Discover How Life Works and Why It Matters (2016, Princeton University Press, ISBN 978-0-691-16742-8)
- A Series of Fortunate Events: Chance and the Making of the Planet, Life, and You (2020), Princeton University Press, ISBN 978-0-691-20175-7.

=== Magazine articles ===
- The Origins of Form: Ancient genes, recycled and re-purposed, control embryonic development in organisms of striking diversity (2005, Natural History Magazine)
- God as Genetic Engineer. A review of Michael Behe's book "The Edge of Evolution: The Search for the Limits of Darwinism" (2007, Science Magazine)
- Regulating Evolution: How Gene Switches Make Life (2008, Scientific American)

=== Filmography ===
Year	Title	Note	Ref.
2017	The Farthest	Emmy award, Outstanding science and technology documentary	
2018	The Serengeti Rules	Emmy award, Best nature documentary	
2019	Oliver Sacks: His Own Life		
2022	All That Breathes		

== Reception ==
Science writer Peter Forbes, writing in The Guardian, calls Endless Forms Most Beautiful an "essential book" and its author "both a distinguished scientist ... and one of our great science writers." In Forbes's view, in The Serengeti Rules Carroll "manages to unite natural history with the hard science of genomics." In her article on Science Based Medicine titled The Essential Role of Regulation In Human Health and In Ecology: The Serengeti Rules, Harriet A. Hall says "This book is a great way to learn about the rules of regulation and about how science works. It's not just a painless way to learn, its positively fun." The documentary film, The Serengeti Rules, was released in 2018 and is based on Carroll's book.

Louise S. Mead, reviewing The Making of the Fittest for the National Center for Science Education, notes that Carroll describes "some of the overwhelming evidence for evolution provided in DNA", using different lines of inquiry such as DNA sequences that code for genes no longer in use, and evidence of evolutionary change. Mead notes that evolutionary theory has predictive power, as with icefish whose ancestors had hemoglobin; as they no longer need it in their icy environment, they have lost it.

Douglas H. Erwin, reviewing Endless Forms Most Beautiful for Artificial Life, remarks that life forms from Drosophila to man have far fewer genes than many biologists expected – in man's case, only some 20,000, which is about the same as a fly. He notes the "astonishing morphological diversity" of animals coming from "such a limited number of genes". He praises Carroll's "insightful and enthusiastic" style, writing in a "witty and engaging" way, pulling the reader into the complexities of Hox and PAX-6, as well as celebrating the Cambrian explosion of life forms, and much else.
