= Extranuclear inheritance =

Transmission of genes occurring outside the nucleus

Extranuclear inheritance or cytoplasmic inheritance is the transmission of genes that occur outside the nucleus. It is found in most eukaryotes and is commonly known to occur in cytoplasmic organelles such as mitochondria and chloroplasts or from cellular parasites like viruses or bacteria.

== Organelles ==
Mitochondria contain their own DNA. They are passed on by mothers to their children via the cytoplasm of the egg.

Mitochondria are organelles which function to transform energy as a result of cellular respiration. Chloroplasts are organelles which function to produce sugars via photosynthesis in plants and algae. The genes located in mitochondria and chloroplasts are very important for proper cellular function. The mitochondrial DNA and other extranuclear types of DNA replicate independently of the DNA located in the nucleus, which is typically arranged in chromosomes that only replicate one time preceding cellular division. The extranuclear genomes of mitochondria and chloroplasts replicate independently of cell division, instead, they replicate in response to a cell's increased energy needs which vary throughout the cell's lifespan. Since they replicate independently, genomic recombination of these genomes is rarely found in offspring, contrary to nuclear genomes in which recombination is common.

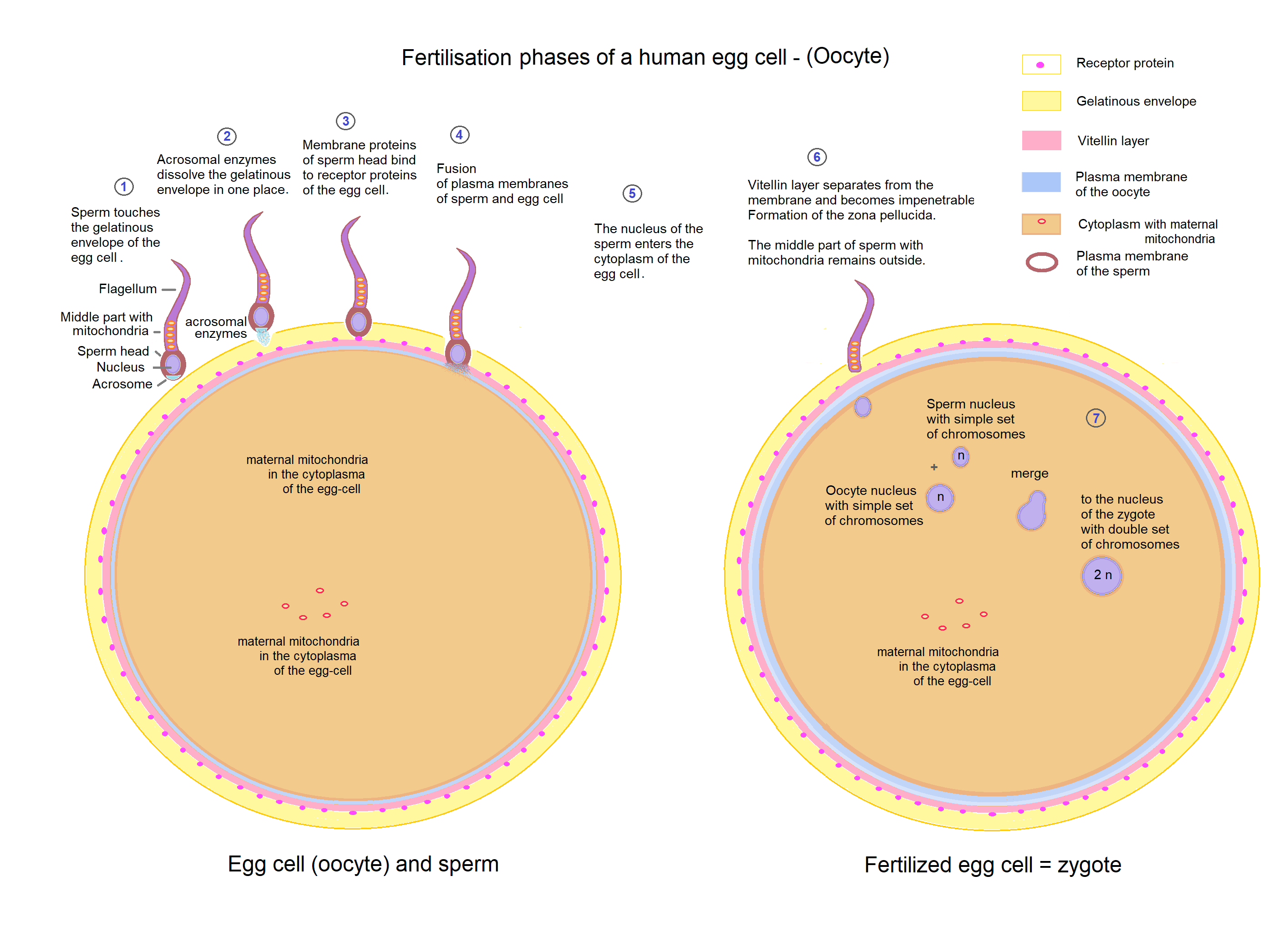

Mitochondrial diseases are inherited from the mother, not from the father. Mitochondria with their mitochondrial DNA are present in the egg cell prior to fertilization by the sperm. In many cases of fertilization, the head of the sperm enters the egg cell, leaving its middle part, with its mitochondria, behind. The mitochondrial DNA of the sperm often remains outside the zygote and is excluded from inheritance.

== Parasites ==
Extranuclear transmission of viral genomes and symbiotic bacteria is also possible. An example of viral genome transmission is perinatal transmission. This occurs from mother to fetus during the perinatal period, which begins before birth and ends about 1 month after birth. During this time viral material may be passed from mother to child in the bloodstream or breastmilk. This is of particular concern with mothers carrying HIV or hepatitis C viruses. Symbiotic cytoplasmic bacteria are also inherited in organisms such as insects and protists.

== Types ==
Three general types of extranuclear inheritance exist.

- Vegetative segregation results from random replication and partitioning of cytoplasmic organelles. It occurs with chloroplasts and mitochondria during mitotic cell divisions and results in daughter cells that contain a random sample of the parent cell's organelles. An example of vegetative segregation is with mitochondria of asexually replicating yeast cells.
- Uniparental inheritance occurs in extranuclear genes when only one parent contributes organellar DNA to the offspring. A classic example of uniparental gene transmission is the maternal inheritance of human mitochondria. The mother's mitochondria are transmitted to the offspring at fertilization via the egg. The father's mitochondrial genes are not transmitted to the offspring via the sperm. Very rare cases which require further investigation have been reported of paternal mitochondrial inheritance in humans, in which the father's mitochondrial genome is found in offspring. Chloroplast genes can also inherit uniparentally during sexual reproduction. They are historically thought to inherit maternally, but paternal inheritance in many species is increasingly being identified. The mechanisms of uniparental inheritance from species to species differ greatly and are quite complicated. For instance, chloroplasts have been found to exhibit maternal, paternal and biparental modes even within the same species. In tobacco (Nicotiana tabacum), the mode of chloroplast inheritance is affected by the temperature and the enzymatic activity of an exonuclease during male gametogenesis.
- Biparental inheritance occurs in extranuclear genes when both parents contribute organellar DNA to the offspring. It may be less common than uniparental extranuclear inheritance, and usually occurs in a permissible species only a fraction of the time. An example of biparental mitochondrial inheritance is in the yeast Saccharomyces cerevisiae. When two haploid cells of opposite mating type fuse they can both contribute mitochondria to the resulting diploid offspring.

== Mutant mitochondria ==
Poky is a mutant of the fungus Neurospora crassa that has extranuclear inheritance. Poky is characterized by slow growth, a defect in mitochondrial ribosome assembly and deficiencies in several cytochromes. Studies of poky mutants were among the first to establish an extranuclear mitochondrial basis for inheritance of a particular genotype. It was initially found, using genetic crosses, that poky is maternally inherited. Subsequently, the primary defect in the poky mutants was determined to be a deletion in the mitochondrial DNA sequence encoding the small subunit of mitochondrial ribosomal RNA.

== See also ==
- Maternal effect
- Plasmid
- Xenia (plants)
