= Xenia (plants) =

Effect of pollen on seeds and fruits

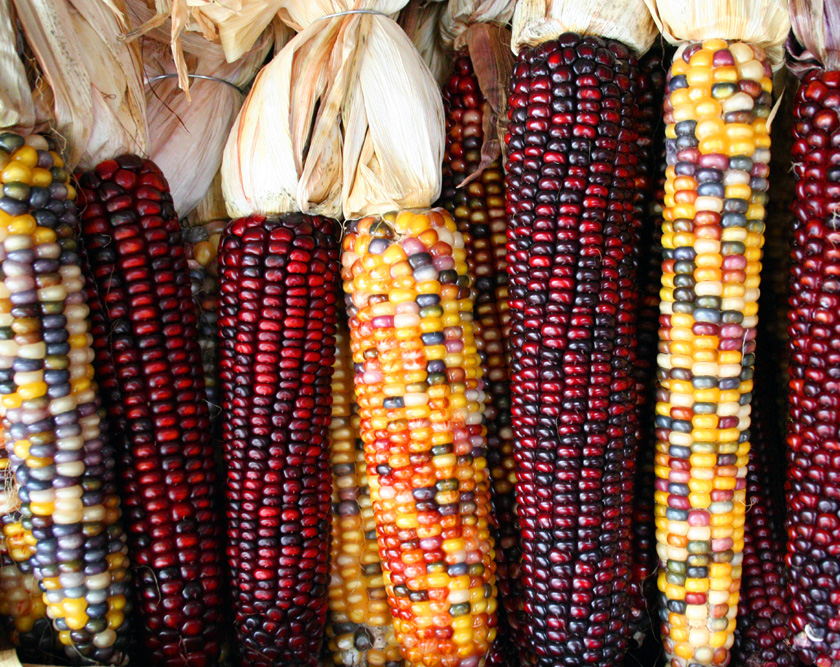
Xenia effects in maize

Xenia (also known as the xenia effect) in plants is the effect of pollen on seeds and fruit of the fertilized plant. The effect is separate from the contribution of the pollen towards the next generation.

The term was coined in 1881 by the botanist Wilhelm Olbers Focke to refer to effects on maternal tissues, including the seed coat and pericarp, but at that time endosperm was also thought to be a maternal tissue, and the term became closely associated with endosperm effects. The term metaxenia was later coined and is still sometimes used to describe the effects on purely maternal tissues.

== Endosperm effects in the seed ==
One of the most familiar examples of xenia is the different colours that can be produced in maize (Zea mays) by assortment of alleles via individual pollen grains. Such maize cobs are cultivated for decorative purposes.

The endosperm tissue, which makes up most of the bulk of a maize seed, is not produced by the mother plant, but is the product of fertilization, and genetic factors carried by the pollen affect its colour. For example, a yellow-seeded race may have its yellow colour determined by a recessive allele. If it receives pollen from a purple-seeded race that has one copy of a dominant allele for purple colour and one copy of the recessive allele for yellow seed, the resulting cob will have some yellow and some purple seeds.

Qualities affected in the endosperm of sorghum may include starchiness, sweetness, waxiness, or other aspects.

== Fruit-growth effects ==
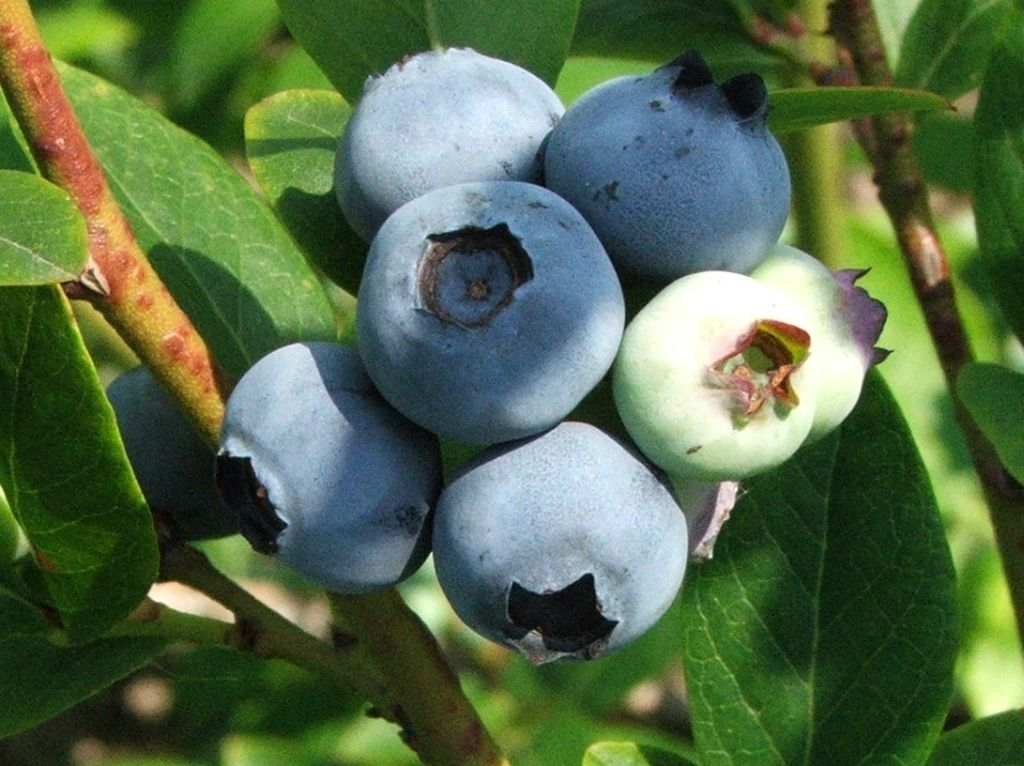
Ripe and unripe fruit of Vaccinium corymbosum

The vigour of the seeds forming inside a fruit can affect the growth of the fruit itself. For example, in two plant species whose fruit ripen asynchronously (Vaccinium corymbosum and Amelanchier arborea) the fruit with more seeds ripened faster.

== Genetically engineered crops ==
Because there is concern about pollen from genetically modified (GM) crops, male-sterile forms are being considered, particularly of maize. Male-fertile non-GM plants must then be grown with the GM crop to ensure pollination. In some cases, a xenia effect due to the genetic difference between the two strains has been observed that increases grain yield, and could make it financially viable to grow the male-sterile plants in such a mixture.

== See also ==
- Extranuclear inheritance
- Maternal effect
- Plasmid
