= Biological determinism =

Research paradigm in behavioural genetics

Biological determinism, also known as genetic determinism, is the belief that human behaviour is directly controlled by an individual's genes or some component of their physiology, generally at the expense of the role of their environment, whether in embryonic development or in learning. Genetic reductionism is a similar concept, but it denotes the level of understanding, where genetic determinism describes the supposed causal role of genes. Biological determinism has been associated with movements in science and society including eugenics, scientific racism, and the debates around the heritability of IQ, the basis of sexual orientation, and evolutionary foundations of cooperation in sociobiology.

In 1892, the German evolutionary biologist August Weismann proposed in his germ plasm theory that heritable information is transmitted only via germ cells, which he thought contained determinants (genes). The English polymath Francis Galton, supposing that undesirable traits such as club foot and criminality were inherited, advocated eugenics, aiming to prevent supposedly defective people from breeding. The American physician Samuel George Morton and the French physician Paul Broca attempted to relate the cranial capacity (internal skull volume) to skin colour, intending to show that white people were superior. Other workers such as the American psychologists H. H. Goddard and Robert Yerkes attempted to measure people's intelligence and to show that the resulting scores were heritable, again to demonstrate the supposed superiority of people with white skin.

Galton popularized the phrase nature and nurture, later often used to characterize the heated debate over whether genes or the environment determined human behaviour. Scientists such as behavioural geneticists now see it as obvious that both factors are essential, and that they are intertwined, especially through the mechanisms of epigenetics. The American biologist and ant specialist E. O. Wilson, who founded the discipline of sociobiology based on observations of animals such as social insects, controversially suggested that its explanations of social behaviour might apply to humans.

== History of application ==
August Weismann's 1892 germ plasm theory. The hereditary material, the germ plasm, is confined to the gonads. Somatic cells (of the body) develop afresh in each generation from the germ plasm.

=== Scientific racism ===
In the 19th century, under the influence of determinist beliefs, the American craniologist Samuel George Morton (1799–1851), and later the French anthropologist Paul Broca (1824–1880), attempted to measure the cranial capacities (internal skull volumes) of people of different skin colours, intending to show that whites were superior to the rest, with larger brains. All the supposed proofs from such studies were invalidated by methodological flaws. The results were used to justify slavery, and to oppose women's suffrage.

=== Germ plasm ===
In 1892, the Austrian biologist August Weismann proposed that multicellular organisms consist of two separate types of cell: somatic cells, which carry out the body's ordinary functions, and germ cells, which transmit heritable information. He called the material that carried the information, now identified as DNA, the germ plasm, and individual components of it, now called genes, determinants which controlled the organism. Weismann argued that there is a one-way transfer of information from the germ cells to somatic cells, so that nothing acquired by the body during an organism's life can affect the germ plasm and the next generation. This effectively denied that Lamarckism (inheritance of acquired characteristics) was a possible mechanism of evolution. The modern equivalent of the theory, expressed at molecular rather than cellular level, is the central dogma of molecular biology.

=== Eugenics ===
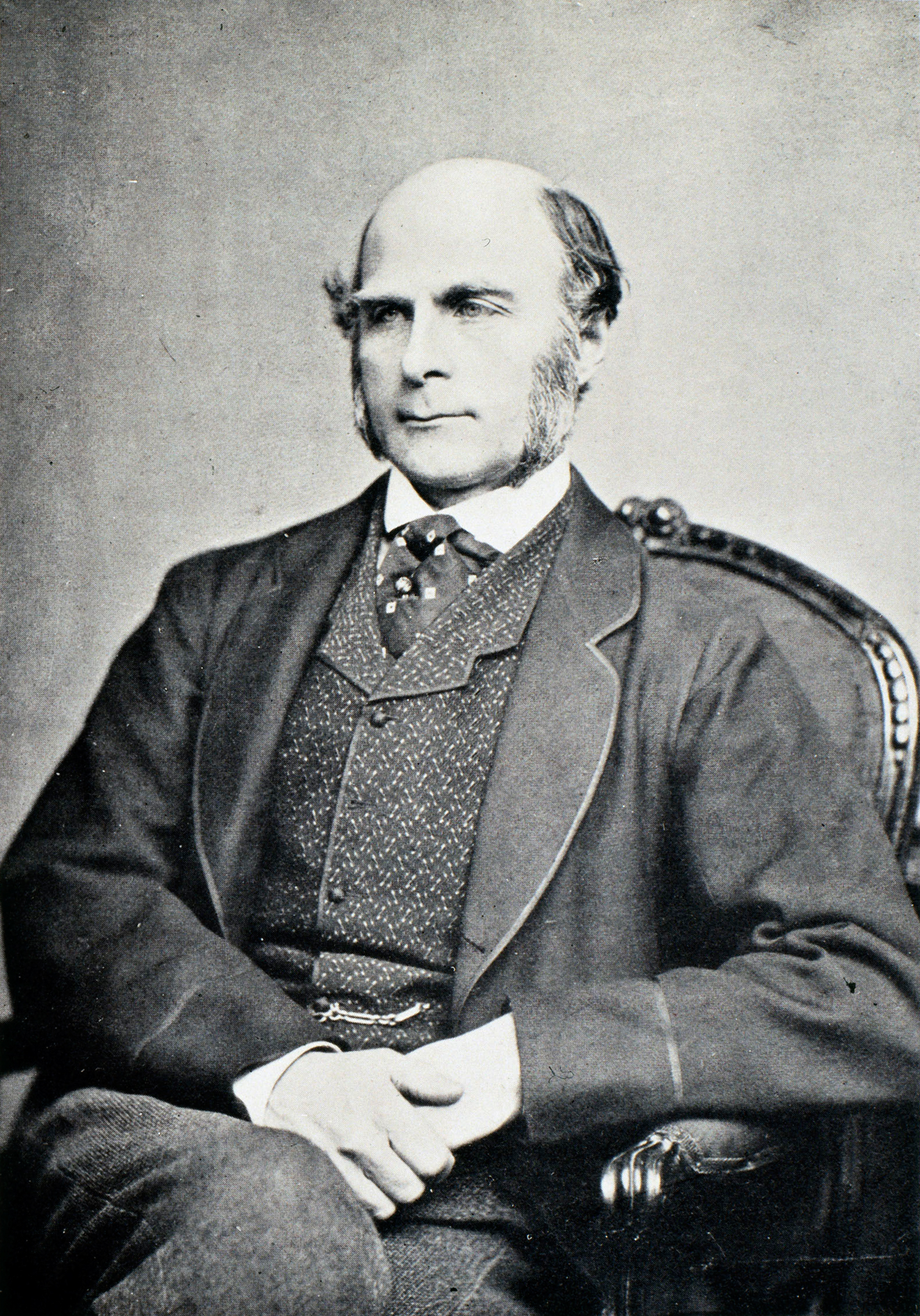
The early eugenicist Francis Galton invented the term eugenics and popularized the phrase nature and nurture.

Early ideas of biological determinism centred on the inheritance of undesirable traits, whether physical such as club foot or cleft palate, or psychological such as alcoholism, bipolar disorder and criminality. The belief that such traits were inherited led to an attempt to solve the problem with the eugenics movement. This was led by a follower of Darwin, Francis Galton (1822–1911), who advocated forcibly reducing breeding among people with those traits. By the 1920s, many U.S. states enacted laws permitting the compulsory sterilization of people considered genetically unfit, including inmates of prisons and psychiatric hospitals. This was followed by similar laws in Germany, and throughout the Western world, in the 1930s.

=== Heritability of IQ ===
Alfred Binet (1857–1911) designed tests specifically to measure performance, not innate ability. From the late 19th century, the American school, led by researchers such as H. H. Goddard (1866–1957), Lewis Terman (1877–1956), and Robert Yerkes (1876–1956), transformed these tests into tools for measuring inherited mental ability. They attempted to measure people's intelligence with IQ tests, to demonstrate that the resulting scores were heritable, and so to conclude that people with white skin were superior to the rest. It proved impossible to design culture-independent tests and to carry out testing in a fair way given that people came from different backgrounds, or were newly arrived immigrants, or were illiterate. The results were used to oppose immigration of people from southern and eastern Europe to the USA.

=== Sociobiology ===
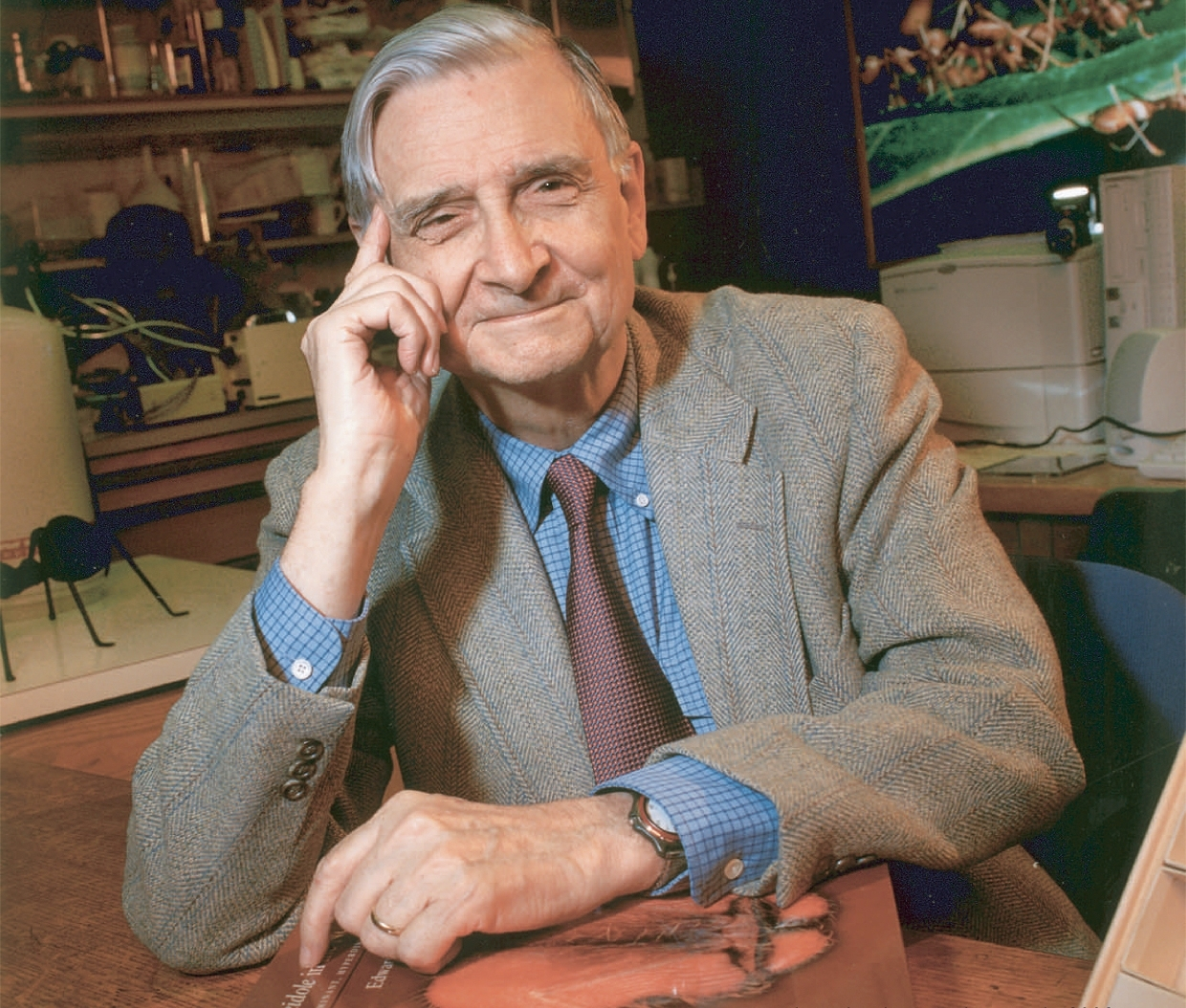
E. O. Wilson reignited debate on biological determinism with his 1975 book Sociobiology: The New Synthesis.

Sociobiology emerged with E. O. Wilson's 1975 book Sociobiology: The New Synthesis. The existence of a putative altruism gene has been debated; the evolutionary biologist W. D. Hamilton proposed "genes underlying altruism" in 1964, while the biologist Graham J. Thompson and colleagues identified the genes OXTR, CD38, COMT, DRD4, DRD5, IGF2, GABRB2 as candidates "affecting altruism". The geneticist Steve Jones argues that altruistic behaviour like "loving our neighbour" is built into the human genome, with the proviso that neighbour means member of "our tribe", someone who shares many genes with the altruist, and that the behaviour can thus be explained by kin selection. Evolutionary biologists such as Jones have argued that genes that did not lead to selfish behaviour would die out compared to genes that did, because the selfish genes would favour themselves. However, the mathematician George Constable and colleagues have argued that altruism can be an evolutionarily stable strategy, making organisms better able to survive random catastrophes. In their 1984 book Not in Our Genes, the evolutionary geneticist Richard Lewontin, the neurobiologist Steven Rose, and the psychologist Leon Kamin criticise sociobiology and biological determinism as a right-wing ideology; their approach was roundly criticised in turn by scholars and critics including the evolutionary biologist Richard Dawkins.

=== Human sexual orientation ===
In the 21st century, the determination of human sexual orientation has been explored. There is a continuum from exclusive attraction to the opposite sex to exclusive attraction to the same sex, caused by the interplay of genetic and environmental influences. There is considerably more evidence for biological causes of sexual orientation than social factors, especially for males.

=== Dating and relationships ===
In the 21st century, incels have applied biological determinism to dating and relationships. Incels primarily subscribe to the "black pill" ideology, which explicitly assumes biological determinism. It argues that women's mating choices are based on qualities such as attractiveness, money, and status, supposing that these factors, especially looks, are biologically determined. It has been noted, on the contrary, that non-genetic factors like exercise and cosmetic surgery can influence a person's looks.

== Nature versus nurture debate ==
The belief in biological determinism was matched in the 20th century by a blank slate denial of any possible influence of genes on human behaviour, leading to a long and heated debate about "nature and nurture". By the 21st century, many scientists had come to feel that the dichotomy made no sense. They noted that genes are expressed within an environment, in particular that of prenatal development, and that gene expression is continuously influenced by the environment through mechanisms such as epigenetics. Epigenetics provides evidence that human behaviours or physiology can be decided by interactions between genes and environments. For example, monozygotic twins usually have exactly identical genomes. Scientists have focused on comparison studies of such twins for evaluating the heritability of genes and the roles of epigenetics in divergences and similarities between monozygotic twins, and have found that epigenetics plays an important part in human behaviours, including the stress response.

== See also ==
- Behavioral epigenetics – Study of epigenetics' influencing behavior
- Behavioural genetics – Study of genetic-environment interactions influencing behaviour
- Blood quantum laws – Laws on Native American status
- Dual inheritance theory – Theory of human behavior
- Gender essentialism – Attribution of intrinsic qualities to genders
- Nature–culture divide – Theoretical foundation of anthropology
- One-drop rule – Historical racial classification rule
- Social determinism – Theory of human behavior
