= Neo-Darwinism =

Used to describe the combination of natural selection and genetics

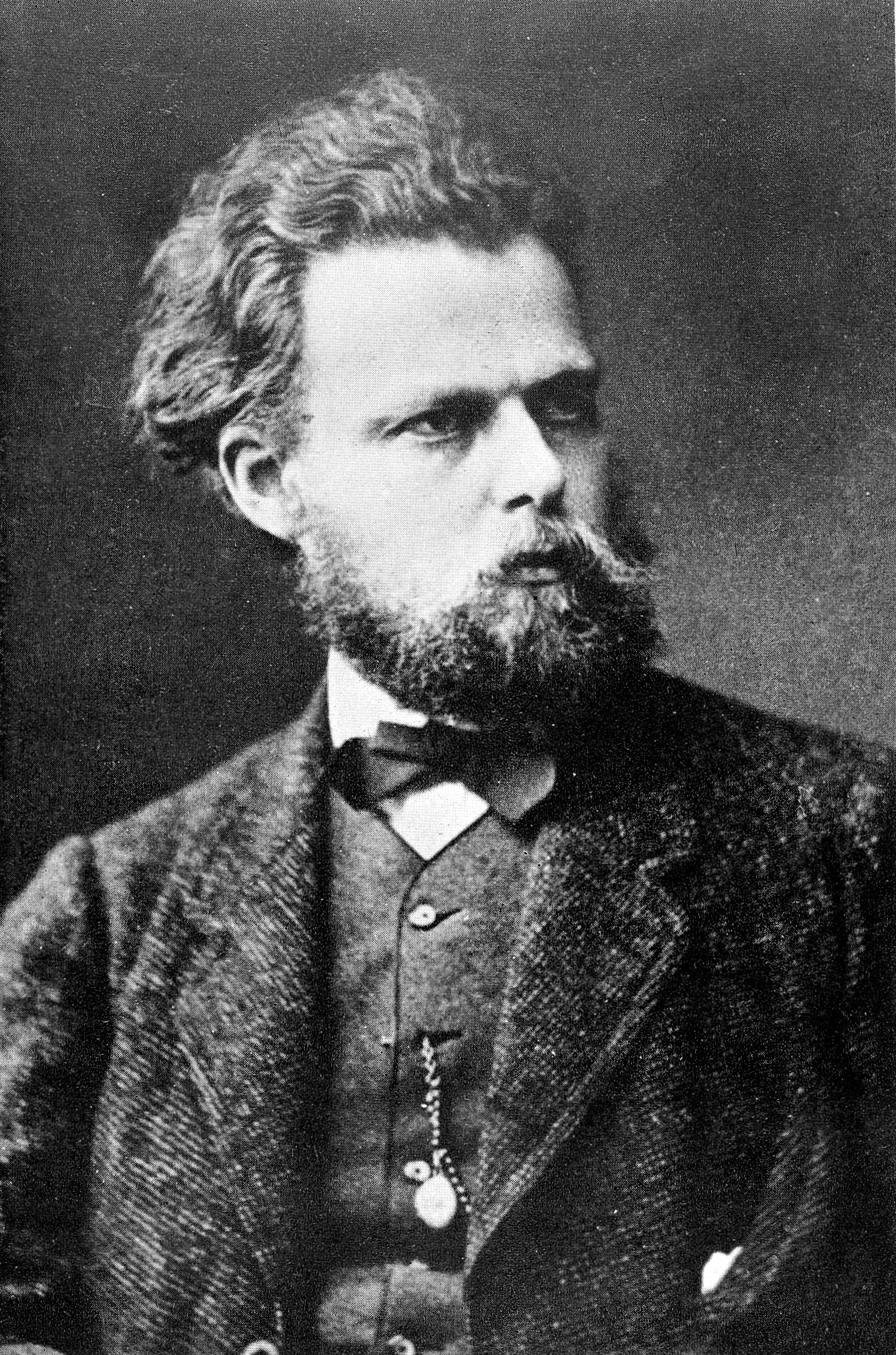
Friedrich Leopold August Weismann, considered the "founder of Neo-Darwinism" for expanding Darwin's theory along genetic lines

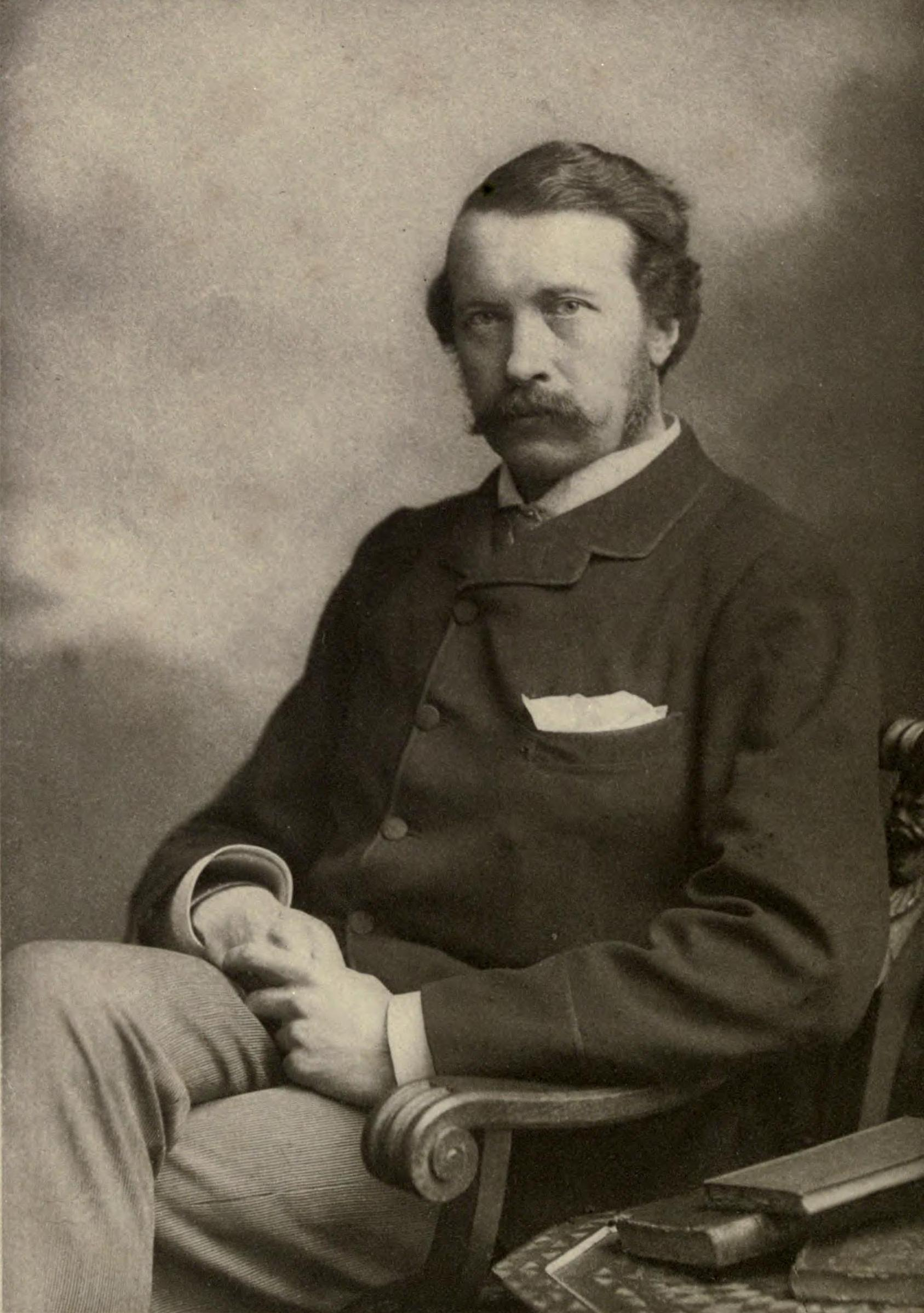
George John Romanes originally used Neo-Darwinism in 1895 to refer to an early modification of Darwin's theory. Photograph by Elliott & Fry (1896)

Neo-Darwinism is generally used to describe any integration of Charles Darwin's theory of evolution by natural selection with Gregor Mendel's theory of genetics. It mostly refers to evolutionary theory from either 1895 (for the combinations of Darwin's and August Weismann's theories of evolution) or 1942 ("modern synthesis"), but it can mean any new Darwinian- and Mendelian-based theory, such as the current evolutionary theory.

== Original use ==
Several major ideas about evolution came together in the population genetics of the early 20th century to form the so-called modern synthesis, including genetic variation, natural selection, and particulate (Mendelian) inheritance. This was at the time called neo-Darwinism.

Darwin's theory of evolution by natural selection, as published in 1859, provided a selection mechanism for evolution, but not a trait transfer mechanism. Lamarckism was still a very popular candidate for this. August Weismann and Alfred Russel Wallace rejected the Lamarckian idea of inheritance of acquired characteristics that Darwin had accepted and later expanded upon in his writings on heredity. The basis for the complete rejection of Lamarckism was Weismann's germ plasm theory. Weismann realised that the cells that produce the germ plasm, or gametes (such as sperm and eggs in animals), separate from the somatic cells that go on to make other body tissues at an early stage in development. Since he could see no obvious means of communication between the two, he asserted that the inheritance of acquired characteristics was therefore impossible, a conclusion now known as the Weismann barrier.

It is, however, usually George Romanes who is credited with the first use of the word in a scientific context. Romanes used the term to describe the combination of natural selection and Weismann's germ plasm theory that evolution occurs solely through natural selection, and not by the inheritance of acquired characteristics resulting from use or disuse, thus using the word to mean "Darwinism without Lamarckism."

Following the development, from about 1918 to 1947, of the modern synthesis of evolutionary biology, the term neo-Darwinian started to be used to refer to that contemporary evolutionary theory.

== Current meaning ==
Biologists, however, have not limited their application of the term neo-Darwinism to the historical synthesis. For example, Ernst Mayr wrote in 1984 that:

The term neo-Darwinism for the synthetic theory [of the early 20th century] is sometimes considered wrong, because the term neo-Darwinism was coined by Romanes in 1895 as a designation of Weismann's theory.

Publications such as Encyclopædia Britannica use neo-Darwinism to refer to current-consensus evolutionary theory, not the version prevalent during the early 20th century. Similarly, Richard Dawkins and Stephen Jay Gould have used neo-Darwinism in their writings and lectures to denote the forms of evolutionary biology that were contemporary when they were writing.

== See also ==
- History of evolutionary thought
