= Germline development =

How an animal develops its sexual-reproduction cells

In developmental biology, the cells that give rise to the gametes are often set aside during embryonic cleavage. During development, these cells will differentiate into primordial germ cells, migrate to the location of the gonad, and form the germline of the animal.

== Creation of germ plasm and primordial germ cells ==
Cleavage in most animals segregates cells containing germ plasm from other cells. The germ plasm effectively turns off gene expression to render the genome of the cell inert. Cells expressing germ plasm become primordial germ cells (PGCs) which will then give rise to the gametes. The germ line development in mammals, on the other hand, occurs by induction and not by an endogenous germ plasm.

=== Germ plasm in fruit fly ===
Germ plasm has been studied in detail in Drosophila. The posterior pole of the embryo contains necessary materials for the fertility of the fly. This cytoplasm, pole plasm, contains specialized materials called polar granules and the pole cells are the precursors to primordial germ cells.

Pole plasm is organized by and contains the proteins and mRNA of the posterior group genes (such as oskar, nanos gene, Tudor, vasa, and Valois). These genes play a role in germ line development to localize nanos mRNA to the posterior and localize germ cell determinants. Drosophila progeny with mutations in these genes fail to produce pole cells and are thus sterile, giving these mutations the name 'grandchildless'. The genes oskar, nanos and germ cell-less (gcl) have important roles. Oskar is sufficient to recruit the other genes to form functional germ plasm. Nanos is required to prevent mitosis and somatic differentiation and for the pole cells to migrate to function as PGCs (see next section). Gcl is necessary (but not sufficient) for pole cell formation. In addition to these genes, Pgc polar granule component blocks phosphorylation and consequently activation of RNA polymerase II and shuts down transcription.

=== Germ plasm in amphibians ===
Similar germ plasm has been identified in Amphibians in the polar cytoplasm at the vegetal pole. This cytoplasm moves to the bottom of the blastocoel and eventually ends up as its own subset of endodermal cells. While specified to produce germ cells, the germ plasm does not irreversibly commit these cells to produce gametes and no other cell type.

== Migration of primordial germ cells ==
=== Fruit flies ===
The first phase of migration in Drosophila occurs when the pole cells move passively and infold into the midgut invagination. Active migration occurs through repellents and attractants. The expression of wunen in the endoderm repels the PGCs out. The expression of columbus and hedgehog attracts the PGCs to the mesodermal precursors of the gonad. Nanos is required during migration. Regardless of PGC injection site, PGCs are able to correctly migrate to their target sites.

=== Zebrafish ===
In zebrafish, the PGCs express two CXCR4 transmembrane receptor proteins. The signaling system involving this protein and its ligand, Sdf1, is necessary and sufficient to direct PGC migration in fish.

=== Frogs ===
In frogs, the PGCs migrate along the mesentery to the gonadal mesoderm facilitated by orientated extracellular matrix with fibronectin. There is also evidence for the CXCR4/Sdf1 system in frogs.

=== Birds ===
In birds, the PGCs arise from the epiblast and migrate to anteriorly of the primitive streak to the germinal crest. From there, they use blood vessels to find their way to the gonad. The CXCR4/Sdf1 system is also used, though may not be the only method necessary.

=== Mammals ===
In the mouse, primordial germ cells (PGCs) arise in the posterior primitive streak of the embryo and start to migrate around 6.25 days after conception. PGCs start to migrate to the embryonic endoderm and then to the hindgut and finally towards the future genital ridges where the somatic gonadal precursors reside. This migration requires a series of attractant and repellent cues as well as a number of adhesion molecules such as E-cadherin and β1-Integrin to guide the migration of PGCs. Around 10 days post conception; the PGCs occupy the genital ridge where they begin to lose their motility and polarized shape.

== Germline development in mammals ==
Mammalian PGCs are specified by signalling between cells (induction), rather than by the segregation of germ plasm as the embryo divides. In mice, PGCs originate from the proximal epiblast, close to the extra-embryonic ectoderm (ExE), of the post-implantation embryo as early as embryonic day 6.5. By E7.5 a founding population of approximately 40 PGCs are generated in this region of the epiblast in the developing mouse embryo. The epiblast, however, also give rise to somatic cell lineages that make up the embryo proper; including the endoderm, ectoderm and mesoderm. The specification of primordial germ cells in mammals is mainly attributed to the downstream functions of two signaling pathways; the BMP signaling pathway and the canonical WNT/β-catenin pathway.

Bone morphogenetic protein 4 (BMP4) is released by the extra-embryonic ectoderm (ExE) at embryonic day 5.5 to 5.75 directly adjacent to the epiblast and causes the region of the epiblast nearest to the ExE to express Blimp1 and Prdm14 in a dose-dependent manner. This is evident as the number of PGCs forming in the epiblast decreases in proportion to the loss of BMP4 alleles. BMP4 acts through its downstream intercellular transcription factors SMAD1 and SMAD5. During approximately the same time, WNT3 starts to be expressed in the posterior visceral endoderm of the epiblast. WNT3 signalling has been shown to be essential in order for the epiblast to acquire responsiveness to the BMP4 signal from the ExE. WNT3 mutants fail to establish a primordial germ cell population, but this can be restored with exogenous WNT activity. The WNT3/β-catenin signalling pathway is essential for the expression of the transcription factor T (Brachyury), a transcription factor that was previously characterized somatic and mesoderm specific genes. T was recently found to be both necessary and sufficient to induce the expression of the known PGC specification genes Blimp1 and Prdm14. The induction of Transcription Factor T was seen 12 hours after BMP/WNT signaling, as opposed to the 24 to 36 hours it took for Blimp1 and Prdm14 genes to be expressed. Transcription factor T acts upstream of BLIMP1 and Prdm14 in PGC specification by binding to the genes respective enhancer elements. While T can activate the expression of Blimp1 and Prdm14 in the absence of both BMP4 and WNT3, pre-exposure of PGC progenitors to WNTs (without BMP4) prevents T from activating these genes. Details on how BMP4 prevents T from inducing mesodermal genes, and only activate PGC specification genes, remain unclear.

Expression of Blimp1 is the earliest known marker of PGC specification. A mutation in the Blimp1 gene results in the formation of PGC-like cells at embryonic day 8.5 that closely resemble their neighbouring somatic cells. A central role of Blimp 1 is the induction of Tcfap2c, a helix-span helix transcription factor. Tcfap2c mutants exhibited an early loss of primordial germ cells. Tcfap2c is thought to repress somatic gene expression, including the mesodermal marker Hoxb1. So, Blimp1, Tcfap2c and Prdm14 together are able to activate and repress the transcription of all the necessary genes to regulate PGC specification. Mutation of Prdm14 results in the formation of PGCs that are lost by embryonic day 11.5. The loss of PGCs in the Prdm14 mutant is due to failure in global erasure of histone 3 methylation patterns. Blimp1 and Prdm14 also elicit another epigenetic event that causes global DNA demethylation.

Other notable genes positively regulated by Blimp1 and Prdm14 are: Sox2, Nanos3, Nanog, Stella and Fragilis. At the same time, Blimp1 and Prdm14 also repress the transcription of programs that drive somatic differentiation by inhibiting transcription of the Hox family genes. In this way, Blimp1 and Prdm14 drive PGC specification by promoting germ line development and potential pluripotency transcriptional programs while also keeping the cells from taking on a somatic fate.

== Generation of mammalian PGCs in vitro ==
With the vast knowledge about in-vivo PGC specification collected over the last few decades, several attempts to generate in-vitro PGCs from post-implantation epiblast were made. Various groups were able to successfully generate PGC-like cells, cultured in the presence of BMP4 and various cytokines. The efficiency of this process was later enhanced by the addition of stem cell factor (SCF), epidermal growth factor (EGF), leukaemia inhibitory factor (LIF) and BMP8B. PGC-like cells generated using this method can be transplanted into a gonad, where the differentiate, and are able to give viable gametes and offspring in vivo. PGC-like cells can also be generated from naïve embryonic stem cells (ESCs) that are cultured for two days in the presence of FGF and Activin-A to adopt an epiblast-like state. These cells are then cultured with BMP4, BMP8B, EGF, LIF and SCF and various cytokines for four more days. These in-vitro generated PGCs can also develop into viable gametes and offspring.

== Differentiation of primordial germ cells ==
Prior to their arrival at the gonads, PGCs express pluripotency factors, generate pluripotent cell lines in cell culture (known as EG cells,) and can produce multi-lineage tumors, known as teratomas. Similar findings in other vertebrates indicate that PGCs are not yet irreversibly committed to produce gametes, and no other cell type. On arrival at the gonads, human and mouse PGCs activate widely conserved germ cell-specific factors, and subsequently down-regulate the expression of pluripotency factors. This transition results in the determination of germ cells, a form of cell commitment that is no longer reversible.

Prior to their occupation of the genital ridge, there is no known difference between XX and XY PGCs. However, once migration is complete and germ cell determination has occurred, these germline cells begin to differentiate according to the gonadal niche.

=== Early male differentiation ===
Male PGCs become known as gonocytes once they cease migration and undergo mitosis. The term gonocyte is generally used to describe all stages post PGC until the gonocytes differentiate into spermatogonia. Anatomically, gonocytes can be identified as large, euchromatic cells that often have two nucleoli in the nucleus.

In the male genital ridge, transient Sry expression causes supporting cells to differentiate into Sertoli cells which then act as the organizing center for testis differentiation. Point mutations or deletions in the human or mouse Sry coding region can lead to female development in XY individuals. Sertoli cells also act to prevent gonocytes from differentiating prematurely. They produce the enzyme CYP26B1 to counteract surrounding retinoic acid. Retinoic acid acts as a signal to the gonocytes to enter meiosis. The gonocyte and Sertoli cells have been shown to form gap and desmosomelike junctions as well as adherins junctions composed of cadherins and connexins. To differentiate into spermatogonia, the gonocytes must lose their junctions to Sertoli cells and become migratory once again. They migrate to the basement membrane of the seminiferous cord and differentiate.

=== Late differentiation ===
In the gonads, the germ cells undergo either spermatogenesis or oogenesis depending on whether the sex is male or female respectively.

=== Spermatogenesis ===
Mitotic germ stem cells, spermatogonia, divide by mitosis to produce spermatocytes committed to meiosis. The spermatocytes divide by meiosis to form spermatids. The post-meiotic spermatids differentiate through spermiogenesis to become mature and functional spermatozoa. Spermatogenic cells at different stages of development in the mouse have a frequency of mutation that is 5 to 10-fold lower than the mutation frequency in somatic cells.

In Drosophila, the ability of premeiotic male germ line cells to repair double-strand breaks declines dramatically with age. In mouse, spermatogenesis declines with advancing paternal age likely due to an increased frequency of meiotic errors.

=== Oogenesis ===
Mitotic germ stem cells, oogonia, divide by mitosis to produce primary oocytes committed to meiosis. Unlike sperm production, oocyte production is not continuous. These primary oocytes begin meiosis but pause in diplotene of meiosis I while in the embryo. All of the oogonia and many primary oocytes die before birth. After puberty in primates, small groups of oocytes and follicles prepare for ovulation by advancing to metaphase II. Only after fertilization is meiosis completed. Meiosis is asymmetric producing polar bodies and oocytes with large amounts of material for embryonic development. The mutation frequency of female mouse germ line cells, like male germ line cells, is also lower than that of somatic cells. Low germ line mutation frequency appears to be due, in part, to elevated levels of DNA repair enzymes that remove potentially mutagenic DNA damages. Enhanced genetic integrity may be a fundamental characteristic of germ line development.

== See also ==
- Germ cell
- Germ cell tumor
