= Germline =

Cells of a multicellular organism that pass on genetic material to progeny

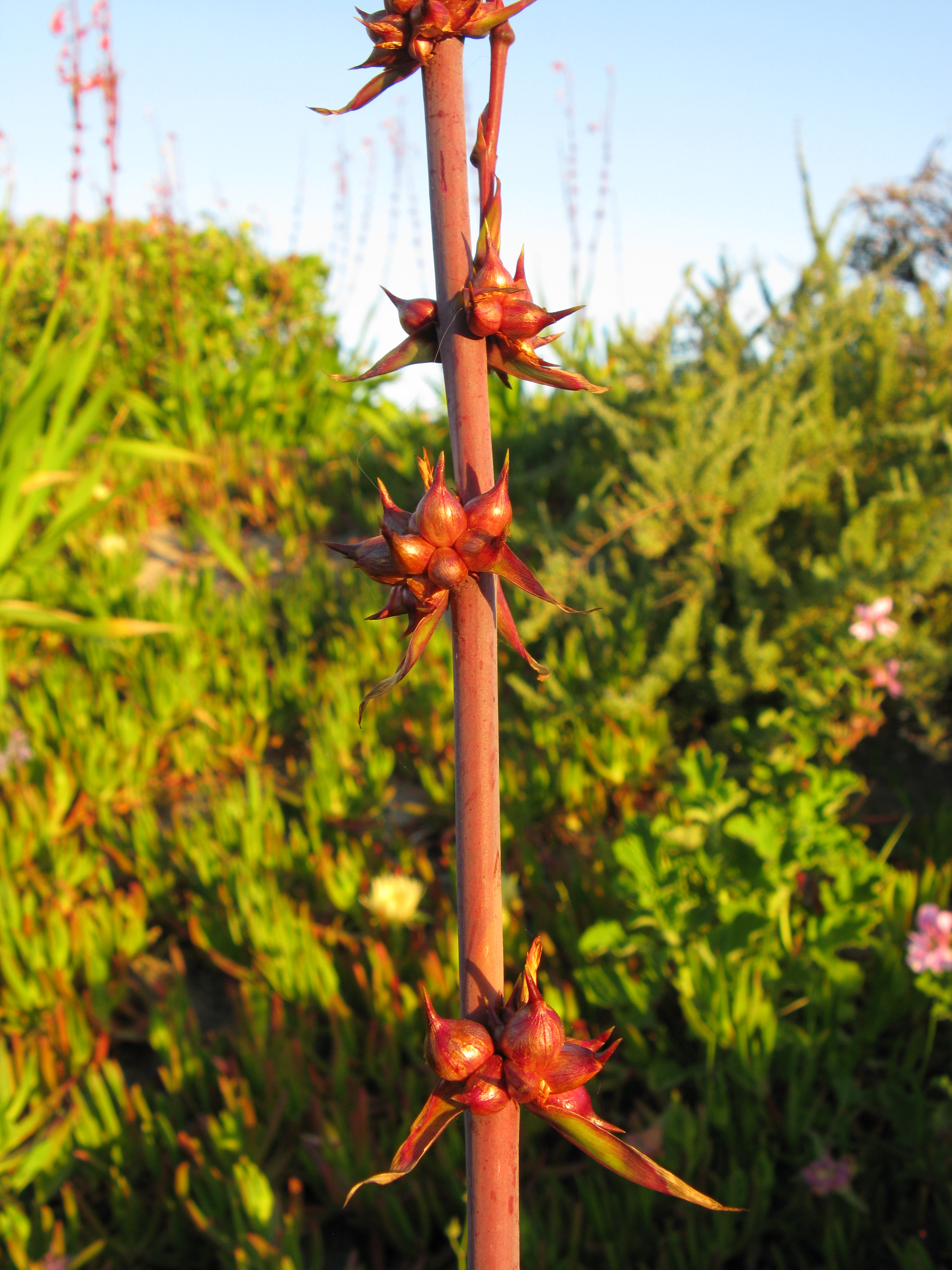
Cormlets of Watsonia meriana, an example of apomixis

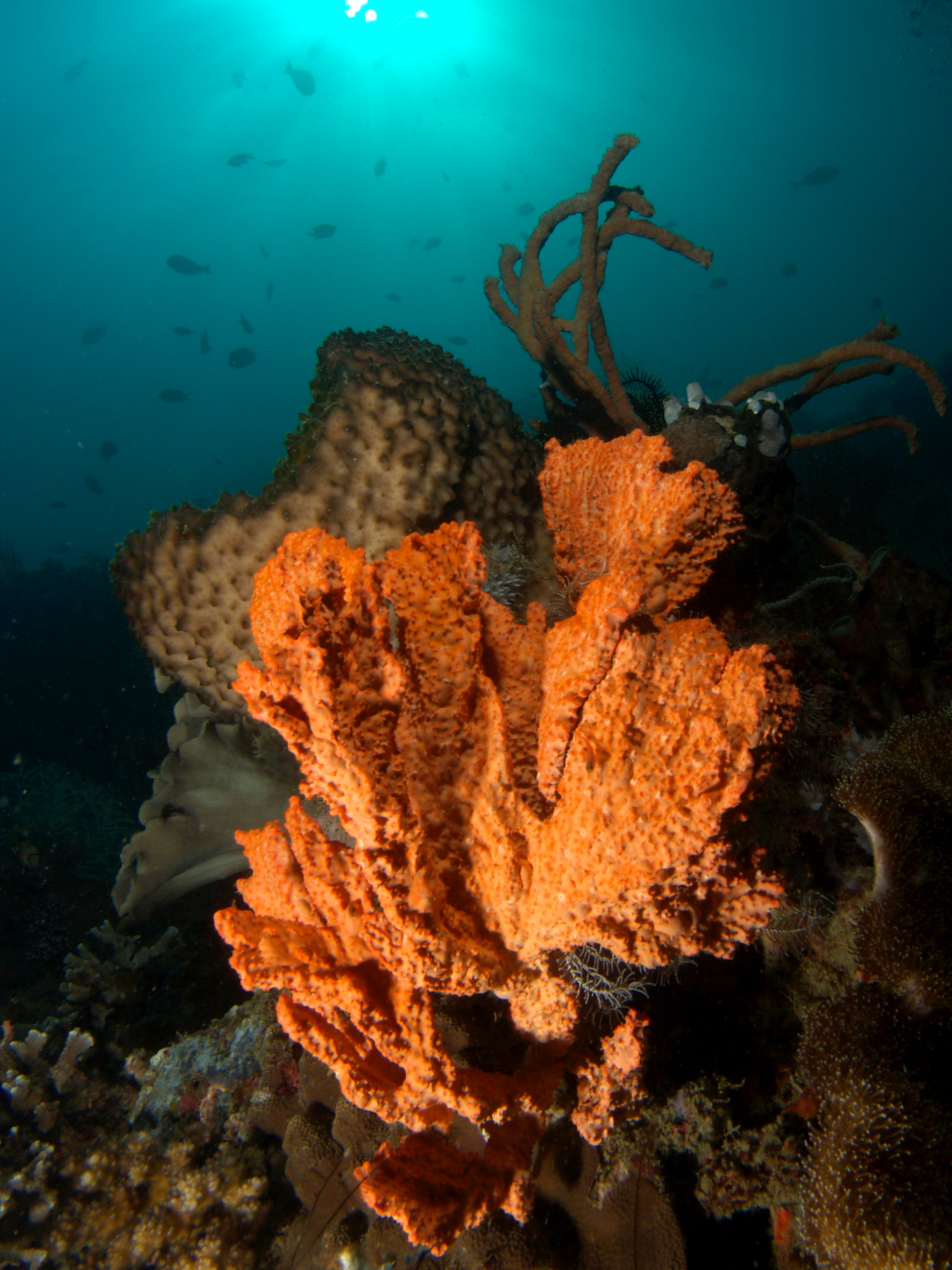
Clathria tuberosa, an example of a sponge that can grow indefinitely from somatic tissue and reconstitute itself from totipotent separated somatic cells

In biology and genetics, the germline is the population of a multicellular organism's cells that develop into germ cells. In other words, they are the cells that form gametes (eggs and sperm), which can come together to form a zygote. They differentiate in the gonads from primordial germ cells into gametogonia, which develop into gametocytes, which develop into the final gametes. This process is known as gametogenesis.

Germ cells pass on genetic material through the process of sexual reproduction. This includes fertilization, recombination and meiosis. These processes help to increase genetic diversity in offspring.

Certain organisms reproduce asexually through processes such as apomixis, parthenogenesis, autogamy, and cloning. Apomixis and Parthenogenesis both involve the development of an embryo without fertilization. Apomixis typically occurs in plants, whereas parthenogenesis is observed in nematodes and in some species of reptiles, birds, and fish. Autogamy refers to self-pollination in plants, while cloning is a technique used to create genetically identical cells or organisms.

In sexually reproducing organisms, cells that are not in the germline are called somatic cells. According to this definition, mutations, recombinations and other genetic changes in the germline may be passed to offspring, but changes in a somatic cell will not be. This need not apply to somatically reproducing organisms, such as some Porifera and many plants. For example, many varieties of citrus, plants in the Rosaceae and some in the Asteraceae, such as Taraxacum, produce seeds apomictically when somatic diploid cells displace the ovule or early embryo.

In an earlier stage of genetic thinking, there was a clear distinction between germline and somatic cells. For example, August Weismann proposed and pointed out, a germline cell is immortal in the sense that it is part of a lineage that has reproduced indefinitely since the beginning of life and, barring accident, could continue doing so indefinitely. However, it is now known in some detail that this distinction between somatic and germ cells is partly artificial and depends on particular circumstances and internal cellular mechanisms such as telomeres and controls such as the selective application of telomerase in germ cells, stem cells and the like.

Not all multicellular organisms differentiate into somatic and germ lines, but in the absence of specialised technical human intervention practically all but the simplest multicellular structures do so. In such organisms somatic cells tend to be practically totipotent, and for over a century sponge cells have been known to reassemble into new sponges after having been separated by forcing them through a sieve.

Germline can refer to a lineage of cells spanning many generations of individuals—for example, the germline that links any living individual to the hypothetical last universal common ancestor, from which all plants and animals descend.

== Evolution ==
Plants and basal metazoans such as sponges (Porifera) and corals (Anthozoa) do not sequester a distinct germline, generating gametes from multipotent stem cell lineages that also give rise to ordinary somatic tissues. It is therefore likely that germline sequestration first evolved in complex animals with sophisticated body plans, i.e. bilaterians. There are several theories on the origin of the strict germline-soma distinction. Setting aside an isolated germ cell population early in embryogenesis might promote cooperation between the somatic cells of a complex multicellular organism. Another recent theory suggests that early germline sequestration evolved to limit the accumulation of deleterious mutations in mitochondrial genes in complex organisms with high energy requirements and fast mitochondrial mutation rates.

== DNA damage, mutation and repair ==
Reactive oxygen species (ROS) are produced as byproducts of metabolism. In germline cells, ROS are likely a significant cause of DNA damages that, upon DNA replication, lead to mutations. 8-Oxoguanine, an oxidized derivative of guanine, is produced by spontaneous oxidation in the germline cells of mice, and during the cell's DNA replication cause GC to TA transversion mutations. Such mutations occur throughout the mouse chromosomes as well as during different stages of gametogenesis.

The mutation frequencies for cells in different stages of gametogenesis are about 5 to 10-fold lower than in somatic cells both for spermatogenesis and oogenesis. The lower frequencies of mutation in germline cells compared to somatic cells appears to be due to more efficient DNA repair of DNA damages, particularly homologous recombinational repair, during germline meiosis. Among humans, about five percent of live-born offspring have a genetic disorder, and of these, about 20% are due to newly arisen germline mutations.

== Epigenetic alterations ==
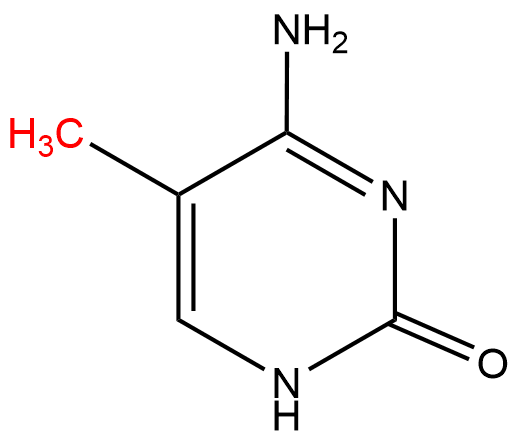
5 methylcytosine methyl highlight. The image shows a cytosine single ring base and a methyl group added on to the 5 carbon. In mammals, DNA methylation occurs almost exclusively at a cytosine that is followed by a guanine.

Epigenetic alterations of DNA include modifications that affect gene expression, but are not caused by changes in the sequence of bases in DNA. A well-studied example of such an alteration is the methylation of DNA cytosine to form 5-methylcytosine. This usually occurs in the DNA sequence CpG, changing the DNA at the CpG site from CpG to 5-mCpG. Methylation of cytosines in CpG sites in promoter regions of genes can reduce or silence gene expression. About 28 million CpG dinucleotides occur in the human genome, and about 24 million CpG sites in the mouse genome (which is 86% as large as the human genome). In most tissues of mammals, on average, 70% to 80% of CpG cytosines are methylated (forming 5-mCpG).

In the mouse, by days 6.25 to 7.25 after fertilization of an egg by a sperm, cells in the embryo are set aside as primordial germ cells (PGCs). These PGCs will later give rise to germline sperm cells or egg cells. At this point the PGCs have high typical levels of methylation. Then primordial germ cells of the mouse undergo genome-wide DNA demethylation, followed by subsequent new methylation to reset the epigenome in order to form an egg or sperm.

In the mouse, PGCs undergo DNA demethylation in two phases. The first phase, starting at about embryonic day 8.5, occurs during PGC proliferation and migration, and it results in genome-wide loss of methylation, involving almost all genomic sequences. This loss of methylation occurs through passive demethylation due to repression of the major components of the methylation machinery. The second phase occurs during embryonic days 9.5 to 13.5 and causes demethylation of most remaining specific loci, including germline-specific and meiosis-specific genes. This second phase of demethylation is mediated by the TET enzymes TET1 and TET2, which carry out the first step in demethylation by converting 5-mC to 5-hydroxymethylcytosine (5-hmC) during embryonic days 9.5 to 10.5. This is likely followed by replication-dependent dilution during embryonic days 11.5 to 13.5. At embryonic day 13.5, PGC genomes display the lowest level of global DNA methylation of all cells in the life cycle.

In the mouse, the great majority of differentially expressed genes in PGCs from embryonic day 9.5 to 13.5, when most genes are demethylated, are upregulated in both male and female PGCs.

Following erasure of DNA methylation marks in mouse PGCs, male and female germ cells undergo new methylation at different time points during gametogenesis. While undergoing mitotic expansion in the developing gonad, the male germline starts the re-methylation process by embryonic day 14.5. The sperm-specific methylation pattern is maintained during mitotic expansion. DNA methylation levels in primary oocytes before birth remain low, and re-methylation occurs after birth in the oocyte growth phase.

== See also ==
- Epigenetics
- Germ line development
- Germinal choice technology
- August Weismann
- Weismann barrier
