= Somatic genome processing =

The genome of most cells of eukaryotes remains mainly constant during life. However, there are cases of genome being altered in specific cells or in different life cycle stages during development. For example, not every human cell has the same genetic content as red blood cells which are devoid of nucleus. One of the best known groups in respect of changes in somatic genome are ciliates. The process resulting in a variation of somatic genome that differs from germline genome is called somatic genome processing.

== Genome loss ==
The result of this process is the removal of a whole genome from a cell. The most known example is the enucleation process of erythrocytes. A processed stem cell goes through changes causing it to lose a nucleus. In the beginning phase, a pro-erythroblast goes through more mitotic divisions, in which erythroblasts with a smaller nucleus are created and the nucleus is moved to the side of the cell. The nucleus becomes isolated from the cytoplasm and then the erythroblast is divided into a reticulocyte with most of the cytoplasm and a pyrenocyte with the condensed nucleus. The pyrenocyte with all the genetic material from the cell is then degraded by a macrophage. The mature red blood cell without a nucleus can properly deliver oxygen.

== Chromatin diminution ==
Chromatin diminution is a process of partial elimination of chromatin genetic material from genome of prospective somatic cells. This process was found to occur during the early developmental stage in three groups: nematodes, copepods, and hagfish One of the first studies regarding somatic genome processing was observed by Boveri large-scale chromatin elimination in parasitic nematode Parascaris univalens. During chromatin diminution, somatic chromosomes becomes fragmented with new telomeres added in many different places and devoid of heterochromatin so it differs from germline cell in respect of structure and genetic content. Germline cells of P. univalens contain only two chromosomes, but in early embryogenesis central euchromatic regions of the chromosomes fragment into diploid somatic set of 2×29 autosomes and 2×6 X chromosomes in females or 2×29 autosomes and 6 X chromosomes in males, which segregate to the two daughter nuclei. After all heterochromatin becomes degraded in cytoplasm. As a result of chromatin diminution P. univalens loses about 80–90% of the total nuclear germ line DNA.

Chromatin diminution occurs also in unicellular eukaryotes, such as ciliates. Ciliates have two nuclei: micronucleus (germ-line cell nucleus) that does not express genes and macronucleus, where most genes are expressed, and is subject to chromatin elimination. During this process chromosomes are fragmented, chromatin eliminated and new DNA molecules with added telomeres are created. The final macronucleus has greater genetic content than micronucleus. In ciliates there are two types of diminution: the first is fragmentation of genome and loss of repetitive sequences and the second is deletion of internally eliminated sequences in chromosomes and the rejoining of remaining DNA fragments.

== Gene unscrambling ==
Gene unscrambling is type of genome-wide processing found particularly in ciliates. The germline genes in the micronucleus of ciliates are composed of protein-coding DNA fragments (MDSs) interrupted by many non-coding DNA sequences, also called internal eliminated (IESs).

In the Spirotrichea class, to which Oxytricha belongs, protein-coding DNA fragments in a micronucleus are located in permuted order. During sexual development the genetic content of somatic macronucleus is derived from micronucleus. First some parts, including IESs, of micronuclear DNA are removed to give transcriptionally active genome in macronucleus. Also micronuclear-encoded MDSs which are nonsequential must undergo gene unscrambling to be ligated in correct order to give functional genes

== Local rearrangements ==
Local rearrangements affect specific loci only. Such rearrangements, for instance, help create genes that produce a great variation of immunoglobulins in vertebrates. During life, organisms have contact with a large number of antigens. Which means that the immune system needs to synthesize a wide range of antibodies. Each immunoglobulin is a tetramer consisting of four polypeptides connected by disulfide bridges. They form two long heavy chains and two short light chains. But vertebrate genome does not code entire genes of heavy and light immunoglobulins, only gene segments. Segments of heavy chain are located on chromosome 14, they include 11 constant gene segments (C_{H}), that are preceded by 123-129 variable segments (V_{H}), 27 diversity gene segments (D_{H}) and 9 joining segments (J_{H}), coding different versions of components V, D, J. Loci of light chains on chromosome 2 (locus κ) and chromosome 22 (locus λ) have similar structure, but they do not contain D segments. At the early stage of lymphocyte B development, loci of immunoglobulins are rearranged. During rearrangement, segment V_{H} on heavy chain locus is connected with one D_{H} segment, then V-D group is combined with J_{H} segment. Eventually, exon with open reading frame coding segments: V_{H}, D_{H}, J_{H} of immunoglobulin. Through RNA splicing during transcription, this exon becomes connected to exon for C_{H} segment. Complementary mRNA of heavy chain can be translated into immunoglobulin specific only for one lymphocyte.
