= Gametocyte =

Eukaryotic germ stem cell

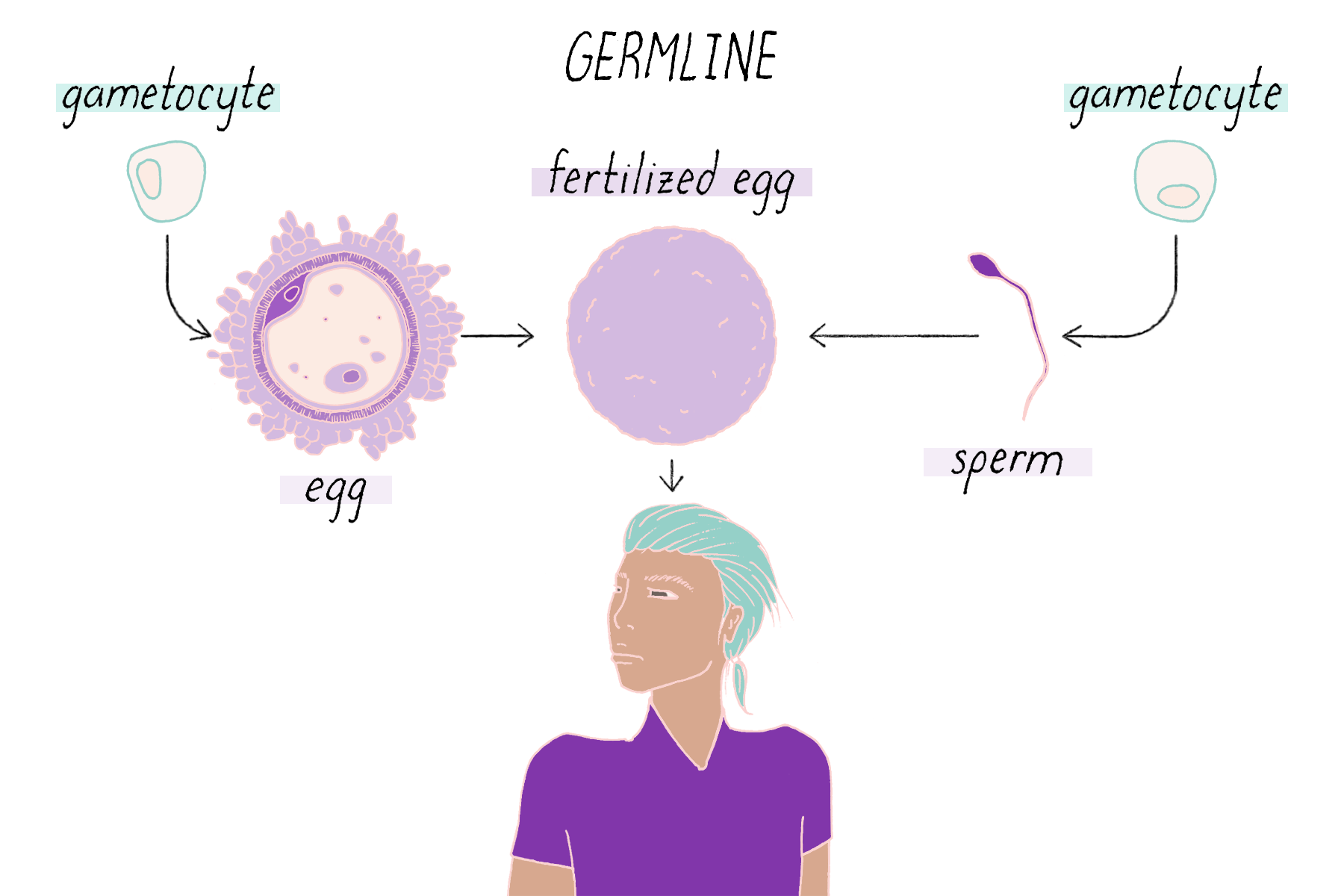
A series of germ cells (including the gametocyte) that give rise to gametes (sperm or egg) which are the cells involved in sexual reproduction. A change in the genetic material of a germline cell can thus be propagated to the next generation.

A gametocyte is a eukaryotic germ cell that divides by mitosis into other gametocytes or by meiosis into gametids during gametogenesis. Male gametocytes are called spermatocytes, and female gametocytes are called oocytes.

== Development ==
The development of gametogonia to primary gametocytes is called gametocytogenesis. The further development of primary gametocytes to secondary gametocytes is a part of gametidogenesis. Gametogenesis is the formation or production of gametes (taking place during meiosis). The development and maturation of sex cells also takes place during meiosis. Gametogenesis is also the process of formation in male and female gametes that occur in the gonads (ovary and testis). Both male and female produce gametes. Male gametocytes are called spermatocytes and female gametocytes are called oocytes. The term gametocyte is also used, for example, when talking about gametocytes of species like Plasmodium falciparum or Plasmodium vivax, which transmit malaria.

== Malaria ==
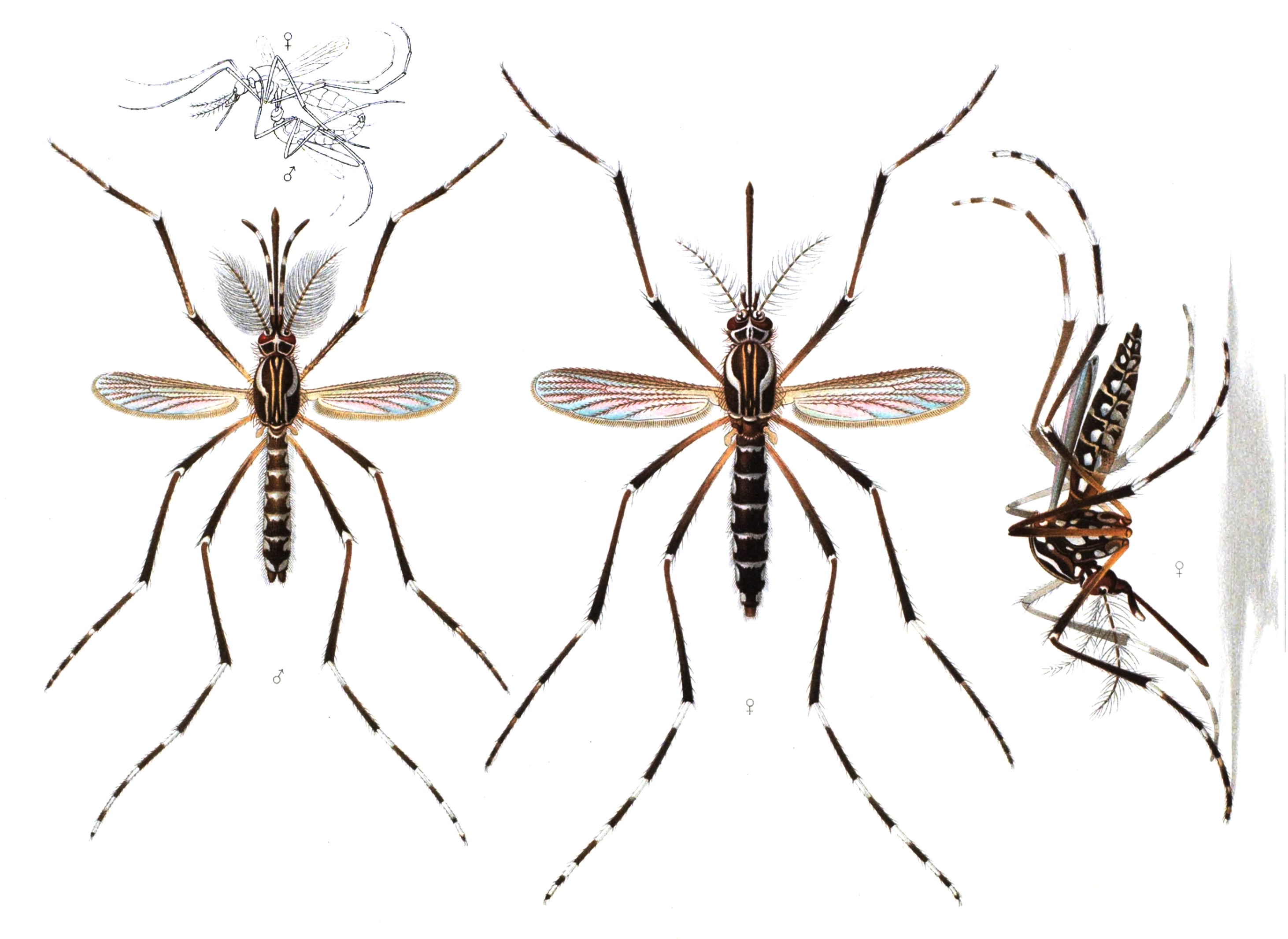

Gametocytes, the precursors of male and female gametes, of malaria parasites (Plasmodium spp.) are formed in the human host through the developmental switch from asexual replication in erythrocytes. Although gametocytes are not responsible for clinical symptoms, they ensure the transmission of malaria to another host. Upon taking a blood meal, gametocytes are transferred to a mosquito's midgut lumen, where they differentiate into male and female gametes. After complete sexual reproduction and successive processes of sporogonic development, mature sporozoites accumulate in the vector's salivary gland, ready to be inoculated into a new host. Therefore, the presence of gametocytes in circulation of infected individuals is imperative for malaria to remain endemic in a given community.

Male and female gametocytes are the components of the malaria parasite life cycle which are taken up from an infected host bloodstream by mosquitoes and thus mediate disease transmission. These gamete precursors are quite distinct from their asexual blood stage counterparts and this is reflected in their distinct patterns of gene expression, cellular development, and metabolism.

=== Plasmodium falciparum ===
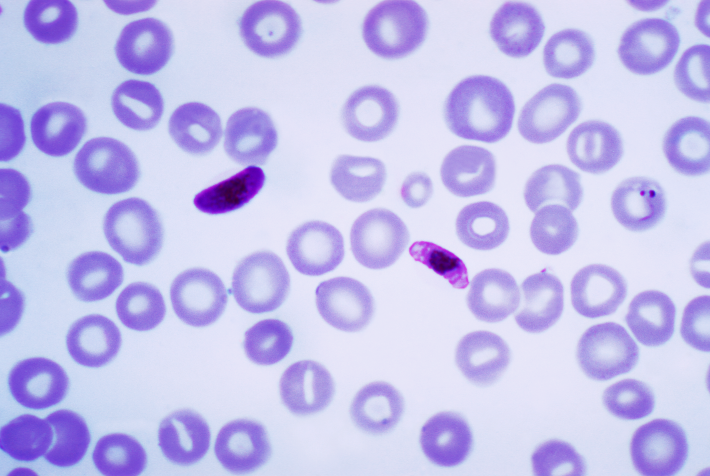
Plasmodium falciparum

Plasmodium falciparum is a protozoan parasite, one of the species that causes malaria in humans. A gametocyte in Plasmodium falciparum is a cell specializing in the transition between the human and the mosquito host. Gametocytes arise from erythrocytic asexual stages. The production of gametocytes directly from hepatic merozoites, which has been described in other species, does not occur in P. falciparum. Gametocytes are capable of inducing specific humoral IgG, and cellular responses, which include induction of TNFa (protein coding), IFNg(gene protein coding) and gd+ lymphocyte proliferation, in addition to immune responses to other stages of the parasite. There has been much debate on the actual point of sexual differentiation and many people have shown that merozoites emerging from a single schizont developed either into further asexual stages or into gametocytes. It has been further shown that the gametocytes from one schizont are all male or all female. This suggests that the trophozoites of the preceding asexual generation were already committed to either sexual development or continuing asexual cycling. In order to adjust to life in such drastically different environments, many changes occur in its cell biology, metabolism, gene expression and protein synthesis. Gametocytes of P. falciparum have been shown to exhibit a different pattern of gene expression than asexual stages, which is unsurprising if one were to consider the difference between these two stages. Transcription and translation levels are not constant during gametocytogenesis: this was shown in drug sensitivity studies where RNA and protein synthesis levels were much more important in the early than the late gametocyte stages. Furthermore, a sex-specific expression has also been discovered, with differences in RNA, mitochondria and ribosome content. The female is preparing for a continued development, and the male is terminally differentiated and only needs what is necessary for exflagellation (cell division cycle, dynein and α-tubulin II). Plasmodium falciparum is both the most deadly and most researched species of malaria. The majority of the research conducted is to find a vaccine or treatment for the disease. Some believe that due to the ineffectiveness of the past, any vaccine found will most likely not become completely effective. Others remain hopeful, citing the fact that the species complex life cycle offers numerous options for vaccines and treatments, as well as the proof that partial immunity does occur in endemic areas in some people.

Mature macrogametocytes are female and mature microgametocytes are male. In P. falciparum, gametocytes are produced from asexual stages. All the gametocytes produced from one sexually committed schizont are of the same sex, suggesting that sex is determined at the very beginning of sexual development. However, gametocyte sex can only be microscopically differentiated from stage III and onward. They are crescent- or sausage- shaped.

=== Plasmodium vivax ===
Plasmodium vivax is a protozoal parasite transmitted to humans through the bite of infected mosquitoes, and is the cause of one of the most common

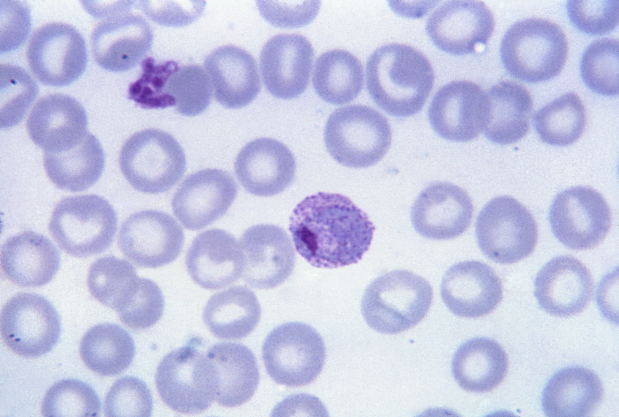
Plasmodium vivax

forms of malaria. Gametocyte carriage is essential for malaria transmission and endemicity of disease; thereby it is a target for malaria control strategies. Malaria-infected individuals may harbour gametocytes below the microscopic detection threshold that can be detected by reverse transcription polymerase chain reaction targeting gametocyte-specific mRNA. Although it is not one of the most dangerous forms, it affects many people annually, and can be somewhat resistant to drugs that are typically used to treat malaria. Once contracted, it can remain in the liver for years if left untreated with the appropriate medications. Given that the condition often occurs in poorer parts of the world, these medications are not always available, and some people continue to experience the effects of Plasmodium vivax for years. These infections take their toll on poor countries in other ways because many hospitalizations are due to initial symptoms of malaria and are costly. When people are first affected by Plasmodium vivax, they frequently show symptoms of high fever, chills, fatigue and profuse sweating. These symptoms often last for a period of about two to three days, but the process may be complicated if a person has additional illnesses. Other symptoms include vomiting, muscle aches, dizziness or a fever that comes and goes. After this primary infection, the disease can go dormant, but the symptoms may return regularly and other conditions like jaundice can develop because Plasmodium vivax establishes itself in the liver. There is no vaccine for Plasmodium vivax, though people who travel to areas with high malaria incidence may receive treatment for it, which is administration of a 14-day course of the drugs chloroquine and primaquine.
