= Transflammation =

Process in the cell during nuclear reprogramming

Transflammation describes the process by which innate immune response mechanisms affect the epigenetic plasticity of a cell during nuclear reprogramming. This phenomenon is essential in dedifferentiating a somatic cell to a pluripotent cell (induction of an induced pluripotent stem cell, iPSC) and also in transdifferentiating a terminally differentiated cell to another terminally differentiated cell.

== Discovery ==
The transflammation process was first discussed by Lee et al. in 2012 in relation to the effectiveness of reprogramming somatic cells to pluripotent cells using viral and non-viral approaches.

iPSC can be prepared from human fibroblast using a retroviral construct with the transcription factors Oct3/4, Sox2, c-Myc and Klf4 according to Takahashi, Yamanaka. However, these vectors are not completely safe and may accidentally integrate into cells DNA and impair the stability of the genome. This is why new methods of transmission (non-integration methods) are currently being developed. One of the available options is the transfer of small proteins or penetrating peptides across the membrane, which is safer but the yield is about 10-100x lower than viral approaches. These conclusions suggest that transcription factor transfer by the viral vector enhances reprogramming efficiency and processes that are involved in this phenomenon and affect epigenetic modifiers have been collectively referred to as transflammation.

== Transflammation process ==
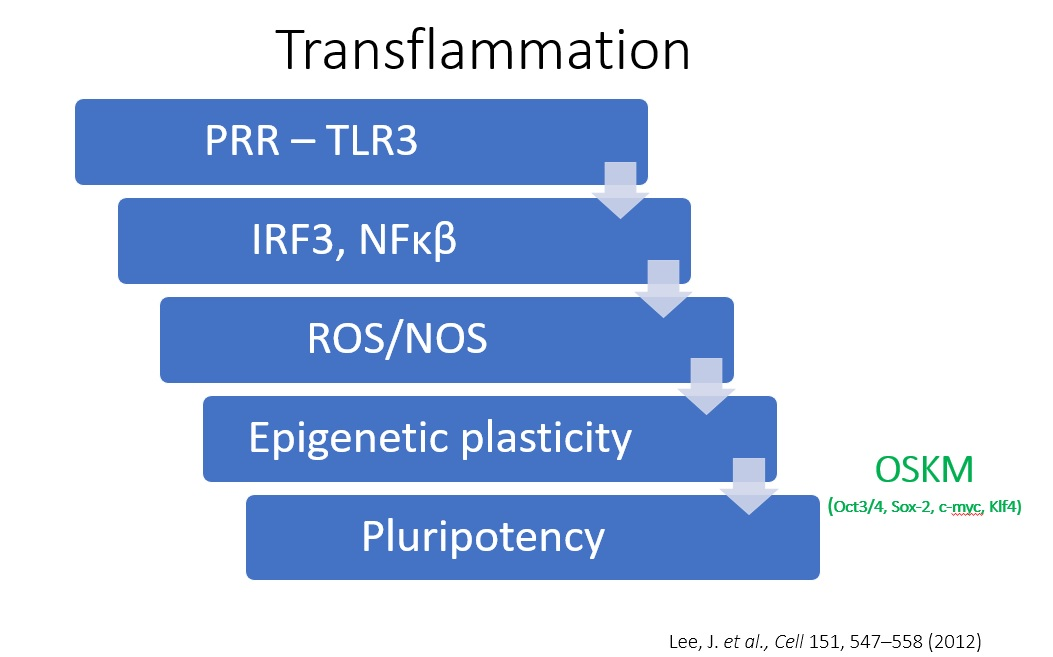
Transflammation scheme

The viral vector stimulates pattern recognition receptors (PRR): toll like receptors (TLRs) or RL-I-like receptors (RLRs), which trigger anti-inflammatory signaling of innate immunity and subsequently activate transcription factors NF-κβ and IRF3. These factors are involved in chromatin remodeling in the nucleus. The result is chromatin release and facilitating transcription factors to bind the genes.

Signalling via oxygen and nitrogen radicals (ROS, NOS) enhance the inflammatory response by generating additional danger associated molecular pattern (DAMP) is also involved in successful cell reprogramming. Inducible NO synthase (iNOS) is responsible for the generation of nitrogen radicals in the cell and it is activated after binding of NF-κβ to promoter.

iPSC forms oxygen radicals only in the initial phase of reprogramming. Later oxidation activity attenuates and up-regulation of antioxidant enzymes occurs. The correct timing and amount of ROS / NOS is critical to the overall efficiency of the process. A cell stimulated with poly I: C (a synthetic TLR3 receptor agonist) with low doses of poly I: C increase iPSC production but higher levels decrease IPSC. It means if the innate immune response is inhibited or the response is disproportionately large, the cell will not be reprogrammed („Goldilocks zone“).
