= Gametogenesis =

Biological process

Gametogenesis is a biological process by which diploid or haploid precursor cells undergo cell division and differentiation to form mature haploid gametes. Depending on the biological life cycle of the organism, gametogenesis occurs by meiotic division of diploid gametocytes into sexually dimorphic gametes, or by mitosis. For example, plants produce gametes through mitosis in gametophytes. The gametophytes grow from haploid spores after sporic meiosis. The existence of a multicellular, haploid phase in the life cycle between meiosis and gametogenesis is also referred to as alternation of generations.

== In animals ==
Scheme showing analogies in the process of maturation of the ovum and the development of the spermatids, following their individual pathways. The oocytes and spermatocytes are both gametocytes. Ova and spermatids are complete gametes. In reality, the first polar body typically dies without dividing.

Animals produce gametes directly through meiosis from diploid germ cells in organs called gonads (testes in males and ovaries in females). During early mammalian embryonic development, pluripotent cells differentiate by induction into primordial germ cells (PGCs) and migrate to the gonads, where they establish the germline and develop into sexually differentiated germ cells (oogonia in females and gonocytes in males). Males and females of a species that reproduce sexually have different forms of gametogenesis:

- Spermatogenesis (male): Once PGCs colonize the developing embryonic testes, they differentiate into gonocytes and remain dormant till birth. After birth, gonocytes differentiate into spermatogonia. Maturation of spermatogonia into sperm begins at puberty through the process of spermatogenesis. Spermatogonia divide mitotically into diploid primary spermatocytes, which undergo first meiotic division to create secondary spermatocytes. These secondary spermatocytes undergo a second meiotic division to produce haploid immature sperm or spermatids. Spermatids develop into mature sperm through spermiogenesis. LH, FSH, GnRH, and androgens are just a few of the hormones that help to promote spermatogenesis.
- Oogenesis (female): Oogenesis is initiated during embryonic development, where diploid Immature germ cells, called oogonia, mature within the ovaries into primary oocytes, which then undergo meiotic division and remain suspended at prophase I until puberty. Completion of meiosis I yields secondary oocytes and first polar bodies. Secondary oocytes initiate meiosis II and remain arrested at metaphase II, yielding mature ova and second polar bodies upon fertilization. This process is regulated by hormones like LH, FSH, GnRH, estrogen and progesterone.

=== Stages ===
Before developing into gametogonia, the embryonic development of gametes is the same in males and females.

==== Common path ====
Gametogonia are usually seen as the initial stage of gametogenesis. However, gametogonia are themselves successors of primordial germ cells (PGCs) that migrate from the dorsal endoderm of the yolk sac along the hindgut to the genital ridge. They multiply by mitosis and, once they have reached the genital ridge in the late embryonic stage, are referred to as gametogonia. Once the germ cells have developed into gametogonia, they are no longer the same between males and females.

==== Individual path ====
From gametogonia, male and female gametes develop differently – males by spermatogenesis and females by oogenesis. However, by convention, the following pattern is common for both:

Cell type	Ploidy/chromosomes in humans	DNA copy number/chromatids in human (Note: Sources are mixed when using this system of numbering. Some sources use the chromatid number when writing "n" rather than the ploidy number. Hence gametogonium and primary gametocyte would be "4n" rather than "2n" with "4c" for copies. The system used below has been determined by wikipedia consensus and should not necessarily be used as the definitive source on the issue.)	Process
Gametogonium	Diploid (2N)/46	2C before replication, 4C after 46 before, 46 × 2 after	Gametocytogenesis (mitosis)
Primary gametocyte	Diploid (2N)/46	2C before replication, 4C after 46 before, 46 × 2 after	Gametidogenesis (meiosis I)
Secondary gametocyte	Haploid (N)/23	2C / 46	Gametidogenesis (meiosis II)
Gametid	Haploid (N)/23	C / 23	
Gamete	Haploid (N)/23	C / 23	

=== Differences between spermatogenesis and oogenesis ===
Spermatogenesis	Oogenesis
Begins at puberty	Starts before birth
Equal division of cells	Unequal division of cells
Produces four functional sperm from each primary spermatocyte	Produces one functional ovum and three polar bodies from each primary oocyte
Takes place in the testis	Takes place in the ovaries
Regulated by testosterone and Follicle Stimulating Hormone	Regulated by oestrogen, progesterone, luteinizing hormone
A continuous process	Stops at menopause
Produces millions of sperms daily	Produces one ovum per menstrual cycle

=== In vitro gametogenesis ===
In vitro gametogenesis (IVG) is the technique of developing in vitro generated gametes, i.e., "the generation of eggs and sperm from pluripotent stem cells in a culture dish." This technique is currently feasible in mice and will likely have future success in humans and nonhuman primates. It allows scientists to create sperm and egg cells by reprogramming adult cells. This way, they could grow embryos in a laboratory. Even though it is a promising technique for fighting disease, it raises several ethical problems.

== In gametangia ==
Fungi, algae, and primitive plants form specialized haploid structures called gametangia, where gametes are produced through mitosis. In some fungi, such as the Zygomycota, the gametangia are single cells, situated on the ends of hyphae, which act as gametes by fusing into a zygote. More typically, gametangia are multicellular structures that differentiate into male and female organs:

- antheridium (male)
- archegonium (female)

== In angiosperms ==
In angiosperms, the male gametes (always two) are produced inside the pollen tube (in 70% of the species) or inside the pollen grain (in 30% of the species) through the division of a generative cell into two sperm nuclei. Depending on the species, this can occur while the pollen forms in the anther (pollen tricellular) or after pollination and growth of the pollen tube (pollen bicellular in the anther and in the stigma). The female gamete is produced inside the embryo sac of the ovule.

In angiosperms, the division of a generative cell into two sperm nuclei results in the production of male gametes (always two), which develop inside the pollen grain (in 30% of species) or the pollen tube (in 70% of species), respectively, of the plant. This may happen before pollination and the development of the pollen tube, depending on the species, or while the pollen is still forming in the anther (pollen is tricellular) (pollen bicellular in the anther and in the stigma). Inside the embryo sac of the ovule, the female gamete is created.

== Meiosis ==
Meiosis is a central feature of gametogenesis, but the adaptive function of meiosis is currently a matter of debate. A key event during meiosis is the pairing of homologous chromosomes and recombination (exchange of genetic information) between homologous chromosomes. This process promotes the production of increased genetic diversity among progeny and the recombinational repair of damage in the DNA to be passed on to progeny. To explain the adaptive function of meiosis (as well as of gametogenesis and the sexual cycle), some authors emphasize diversity, and others emphasize DNA repair.

Although meiosis is a crucial component of gametogenesis, its function in adaptation is still unknown. In sexually reproducing organisms, it is a type of cell division that results in fewer chromosomes being present in gametes.

Homology Effects

There are two key differences between mammalian and plant gametogenesis. First, there is no predetermined germline in plants. Male or female gametophyte-producing cells diverge from the reproductive meristem, a totipotent clump of developing cells in the adult plant that creates all the flower's features (both sexual and asexual structures). Second, meiosis is followed by mitotic divisions and differentiation to create the gametes. In plants, sister, non-gametic cells are connected to the female gametes (the egg cell and the central cell) (the synergids and the antipodal cells). The haploid microspore passes through mitosis to create a vegetative and generative cell during male gametogenesis. The generative cell undergoes a second mitotic division, resulting in the creation of two.

Premeiotic, postmeiotic, premitotic, or postmitotic events are all possibilities if imprints are created during male and female gametogenesis. However, if only one of the daughter cells receives parental imprints following mitosis, this would result in two functionally different female gametes or two functionally different sperm cells. Demethylation is seen in the pollen grain following the second meiosis and before the generative cell's mitosis, as was discussed in the section before this one. Along with pollen differentiation, various structural and compositional DNA alterations also occur. These modifications are potential steps for the genome-wide erasure and/or reprogramming of the imprinting that happens in animals. During the growth of sperm cells, the male DNA is extensively demethylated in plants, whereas the converse is true in animals.

== See also ==
- In vitro spermatogenesis
- Microgametogenesis
- Nullisomic
