= Microgametogenesis =

Microgametogenesis is a process in plant reproduction where the microgametophyte develops from a single microspore via mitosis, forming the multicellular pollen grain. In angiosperms, the microgametopgyte is composed of three cells, the vegetative cell and two sperm cells, while in gymnosperms there can be three or more cells depending on the species.

In angiosperms, microgametogenesis occurs largely in the anthers beginning with a haploid microspore formed by meiosis of the microsporocyte. The first mitotic division of the microspore is asymmetric, yielding the generative nucleus and the vegetative nucleus. The vegetative cell is transcriptionally and metabolically active, having a large nucleus and cytoplasm, while the generative cell has a reduced cytoplasm and highly condensed chromatin. Transcription of the haploid genome begins during this first mitotic division, enabling selection on defective meiotic products beginning at this stage.

The generative cell undergoes a second mitosis, giving rise to the sperm cells. These sperm cells share a periplasmic space and are not divided by cell walls. The second mitosis can occur while the pollen is still in the anther or in the pollen tube as it grows towards the ovules. Plant species can be classified as having trinucleate pollen (generative cell divides while the pollen grain is in the anther) or binucleate pollen (generative cell divides in the pollen tube), with some species producing a mix of trinucleate and binucleate pollen. The sperm cells will eventually fertilize the egg and central cell during double fertilization.

The vegetative cell is non-reproductive and serves to support function of the sperm cells and develop into the pollen tube upon pollen germination. A cytoplasmic projection from the sperm or generative cells into the vegetative nucleus maintains contact between the cells and facilitates travel of the three nuclei down the growing pollen tube. The cytoplasmic projection as well as plasmodesmata-like structures connecting the sperm and vegetative cytoplasm have been proposed to facilitate communication between the cells.

== See also ==
- Gametogenesis
