= Genetic reductionism =

Belief that genetics explains all aspects of human behavior

Genetic reductionism is the belief that understanding genes is sufficient to understand all aspects of human behavior. It is a specific form of reductionism and of biological determinism, based on a perspective which defines genes as distinct units of information with consistent properties. It also covers attempts to define specific phenomena in exclusively genetic terms, as in the case of the "warrior gene".

The concept has been criticized by many biologists. According to Affifi (2017), "With the discoveries of pleiotropy and epistasis, cracks in the reductionist paradigm emerged even before the rise of molecular biology, but the full extent of the interdependency and flexible adaptivity of the genome has really come to light in the past 10 years..." The genetic reductionist perspective can be appropriate when used to identify changes in specific genetic loci that cause differences in a given phenotype.
