= Gametid =

Complementary gamete to the gamete that gives rise to a zygote after conception

A gametid is a complementary gamete to the gamete that gives rise to a zygote after conception. During meiosis, four gametes, or haploid cells, are the products of diploid cell division. Two gametes, one egg and one sperm, unite during conception, yielding a zygote. For each gamete that makes a zygote, there is a complementary gamete, or gametid. There are gametids for both egg and sperm gametes.

Another word for a gametid is a nontransmitted gamete. These gametids come from the same primary gametocyte that yields the gamete that fuses to form the zygote. Gametids do not always develop into mature gametes. A common example of a gametid that does not develop into a mature gamete is a polar body. Gametogenesis is the process by which mature gametes are produced. In sequential order, gametes develop from primary gametocytes, to secondary gametocytes, to gametids, and then finally to gametes.

== See also ==
- Gametocyte
