= August Weismann =

German evolutionary biologist (1834–1914)

August Weismann ForMemRS HonFRSE
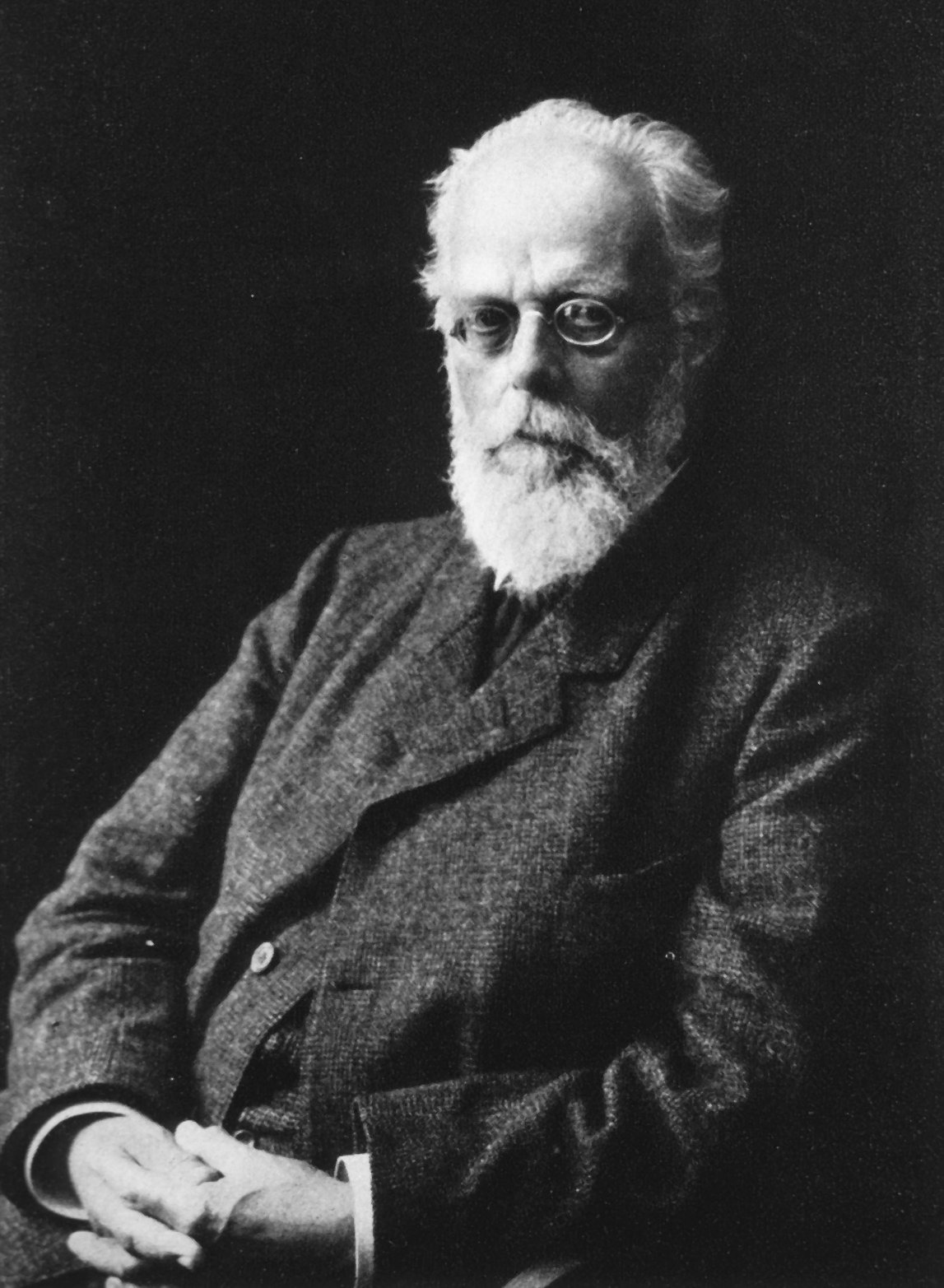
- Born: 17 January 1834; Frankfurt am Main, German Confederation
- Died: 5 November 1914 (aged 80); Freiburg, German Empire
- Education: University of Göttingen
- Known for: Germ plasm theory
- Awards: Darwin–Wallace Medal (Silver, 1908)

August Friedrich Leopold Weismann (German: [ˈvaɪsman]; 17 January 1834 – 5 November 1914) was a German evolutionary biologist. Fellow German Ernst Mayr ranked him as the second most notable evolutionary theorist of the 19th century, after Charles Darwin. Weismann became the Director of the Zoological Institute and the first Professor of Zoology at Freiburg.

His main contribution involved germ plasm theory, at one time also known as Weismannism, according to which inheritance (in a multicellular animal) only takes place by means of the germ cells—the gametes such as egg cells and sperm cells. Other cells of the body—somatic cells—do not function as agents of heredity. The effect is one-way: germ cells produce somatic cells and are not affected by anything the somatic cells learn or therefore any ability an individual acquires during its life. Genetic information cannot pass from soma to germ plasm and on to the next generation. Biologists refer to this concept as the Weismann barrier. This idea, if true, rules out the inheritance of acquired characteristics as proposed by Jean-Baptiste Lamarck. However, a careful reading of Weismann's work over the span of his entire career shows that he had more nuanced views, insisting, like Darwin, that a variable environment was necessary to cause variation in the hereditary material.

The idea of the Weismann barrier is central to the modern synthesis of the early 20th century, though scholars do not express it today in the same terms. In Weismann's opinion the largely random process of mutation, which must occur in the gametes (or stem cells that make them) is the only source of change for natural selection to work on. Weismann became one of the first biologists to deny Lamarckism entirely. Weismann's ideas preceded the rediscovery of Gregor Mendel's work, and though Weismann was cagey about accepting Mendelism, younger workers soon made the connection.

== Life ==
=== Youth and studies ===
Weismann was born a son of high school teacher Johann (Jean) Konrad Weismann (1804–1880), a graduate of ancient languages and theology, and his wife Elise (1803–1850), née Lübbren, the daughter of the county councillor and mayor of Stade, on 17 January 1834 in Frankfurt am Main. He had a typical 19th century bourgeois education, receiving music lessons from the age of four, and drafting and painting lessons from Jakob Becker (1810–1872) at the Frankfurter Städel Institute from the age of 14. His piano teacher was a devoted butterfly collector and introduced him to the collecting of imagos and caterpillars. But studying natural sciences was out of the question due to the cost involved and limited job prospects. A friend of the family, chemist Friedrich Wöhler (1800–1882), recommended studying medicine. A foundation from the inheritance of Weismann's mother allowed him to take up studies in Göttingen. Following his graduation in 1856, he wrote his dissertation on the synthesis of hippuric acid in the human body.

=== Professional life ===
Immediately after university, Weismann took on a post as assistant at the Städtische Klinik (city clinic) in Rostock. Weismann successfully submitted two manuscripts, one about hippuric acid in herbivores, and one about the salt content of the Baltic Sea, and won two prizes. The paper about the salt content dissuaded him from becoming a chemist, since he felt himself lacking in apothecarial accuracy.

After a study visit to see Vienna's museums and clinics, he visited Italy (1859) and Paris (1860). He returned to Frankfurt as personal physician to the banished Archduke Stephen of Austria at Schaumburg Castle from 1861 to 1863. During the war between Austria, France and Italy in 1859, he became Chief Medical Officer in the military, and on a leave from duty he walked through Northern Italy and the County of Tyrol. After a sabbatical in Paris, he worked with Rudolf Leuckart at the University of Gießen.

From 1863, he was privatdozent in comparative anatomy and zoology; from 1866 extraordinary professor; and from 1873 to 1912 full professor, first holder of the chair in zoology and director of the zoological institute at Albert Ludwig University of Freiburg in Breisgau. He retired in 1912. His earlier work was largely concerned with purely zoological investigations, one of his earliest works dealing with the development of the Diptera. Microscopical work, however, became impossible to him owing to impaired eyesight, and he turned his attention to wider problems of biological inquiry.

== Family ==
In 1867 he married Mary Dorothea Gruber.

Their son, Julius Weismann (1879–1950), was a composer.

== Contributions to evolutionary biology ==
At the beginning of Weismann's preoccupation with evolutionary theory was his grappling with Christian creationism as a possible alternative. In his work Über die Berechtigung der Darwin'schen Theorie (On the justification of the Darwinian theory) he compared creationism and evolutionary theory, and concluded that many biological facts can be seamlessly accommodated within evolutionary theory, but remain puzzling if considered the result of acts of creation.

After this work, Weismann accepted evolution as a fact on a par with the fundamental assumptions of astronomy (e.g. Heliocentrism). Weismann's position towards the mechanism of inheritance and its role for evolution changed during his life. Three periods can be distinguished.

=== German work on cells ===
Weismann's germ plasm theory. The hereditary material, the germ plasm, is transmitted only by the gonads. Somatic cells (of the body) develop afresh in each generation from the germ plasm.

Weismann's work on the demarcation between germ-line and soma can scarcely be appreciated without considering the work of (mostly) German biologists during the second half of the 19th century. This was the time that the mechanisms of cell division began to be understood. Eduard Strasburger, Walther Flemming, Heinrich von Waldeyer and the Belgian Edouard Van Beneden laid the basis for the cytology and cytogenetics of the 20th century. Strasburger, the outstanding botanical physiologist of that century, coined the terms nucleoplasm and cytoplasm. He said "new cell nuclei can only arise from the division of other cell nuclei". Van Beneden discovered how chromosomes combined at meiosis, during the production of gametes, and discovered and named chromatin. Walther Flemming, the founder of cytogenetics, named mitosis, and pronounced "omnis nucleus e nucleo" (which means the same as Strasburger's dictum). The discovery of mitosis, meiosis and chromosomes is regarded as one of the 100 most important scientific discoveries of all times, and one of the 10 most important discoveries in cell biology.

Meiosis was discovered and described for the first time in sea urchin eggs in 1876, by Oscar Hertwig. It was described again in 1883, at the level of chromosomes, by Van Beneden in Ascaris eggs. The significance of meiosis for reproduction and inheritance, however, was first described in 1890 by Weismann, who noted that two cell divisions were necessary to transform one diploid cell into four haploid cells if the number of chromosomes had to be maintained. Thus the work of the earlier cytologists laid the ground for Weismann, who turned his mind to the consequences for evolution, which was an aspect the cytologists had not addressed. All this took place before the rediscovery of the work of Mendel.

=== 1868–1881/82 ===
Weismann started out believing, like many other 19th century scientists, among them Charles Darwin, that the observed variability of individuals of one species is due to the inheritance of sports (Darwin's term). He believed, as written in 1876, that transmutation of species is directly due to the influence of environment. He also wrote, "if every variation is regarded as a reaction of the organism to external conditions, as a deviation of the inherited line of development, it follows that no evolution can occur without a change of the environment". (This is close to the modern use of the concept that changes in the environment can mediate selective pressures on a population, so leading to evolutionary change.) Weismann also used the classic Lamarckian metaphor of use and disuse of an organ.

Weismann came to understand during this part of his scientific career that evolution is never a perfect process and that an organism's evolutionary trajectory is constrained by its pre-existing physiology, in particular focusing on how the developmental biology of a species limited which directions it could evolve in.

=== 1882–1895 ===
Weismann's first rejection of the inheritance of acquired traits was in a lecture in 1883, titled "On inheritance" ("Über die Vererbung"). Again, as in his treatise on creation vs. evolution, he attempts to explain individual examples with either theory. For instance, the existence of non-reproductive castes of ants, such as workers and soldiers, cannot be explained by inheritance of acquired characters. Germ plasm theory, on the other hand, does so effortlessly. Weismann used this theory to explain Lamark's original examples for "use and disuse", such as the tendency to have degenerate wings and stronger feet in domesticated waterfowl.

=== 1896–1910 ===
Weismann worked on the embryology of sea urchin eggs, and in the course of this observed different kinds of cell division, namely equatorial division and reductional division, terms he coined (Äquatorialteilung and Reduktionsteilung respectively).

His germ plasm theory states that multicellular organisms consist of germ cells containing heritable information, and somatic cells that carry out ordinary bodily functions. The germ cells are influenced neither by environmental influences nor by learning or morphological changes that happen during the lifetime of an organism, which information is lost after each generation. The concept as he proposed it was referred to as Weismannism in his day, for example in the book An examination of Weismannism by George Romanes This idea was illuminated and explained by the rediscovery of Gregor Mendel's work in the early years of the 20th century (see Mendelian inheritance).

=== Experiments on the inheritance of mutilation ===
The idea that germline cells contain information that passes to each generation unaffected by experience and independent of the somatic (body) cells, came to be referred to as the Weismann barrier, and is frequently quoted as putting a final end to the theory of Lamarck and the inheritance of acquired characteristics. What Lamarck claimed was the inheritance of characteristics acquired through effort, or will.

Weismann conducted the experiment of removing the tails of 68 white mice, repeatedly over 5 generations, and reporting that no mice were born in consequence without a tail or even with a shorter tail. He stated that "901 young were produced by five generations of artificially mutilated parents, and yet there was not a single example of a rudimentary tail or of any other abnormality in this organ." Weismann was aware of the limitations of this experiment, and made it clear that he embarked on the experiment precisely because, at the time, there were many claims of animals inheriting mutilations (he refers to a claim regarding a cat that had lost its tail having numerous tail-less offspring). There were also claims of Jews born without foreskins. None of these claims, he said, were backed up by reliable evidence that the parent had in fact been mutilated, leaving the perfectly plausible possibility that the modified offspring were the result of a mutated gene. The purpose of his experiment was to lay the claims of inherited mutilation to rest. The results were consistent with Weismann's germ plasm theory.

== Awards and honors ==
Weismann was elected to honorary membership of the Manchester Literary and Philosophical Society in 1894. He was nominated the Honorary Fellow of the University of Tartu in 1902. He was elected an International Member of the American Philosophical Society in 1906. He was awarded the Linnean Society of London's Darwin-Wallace Medal in 1908. He was elected an International Member of the United States National Academy of Sciences in 1913.

Ernst Mayr judged Weismann to be the most important evolutionary thinker between Darwin and the evolutionary synthesis around 1930–1940, and "one of the great biologists of all time".

== Publications ==
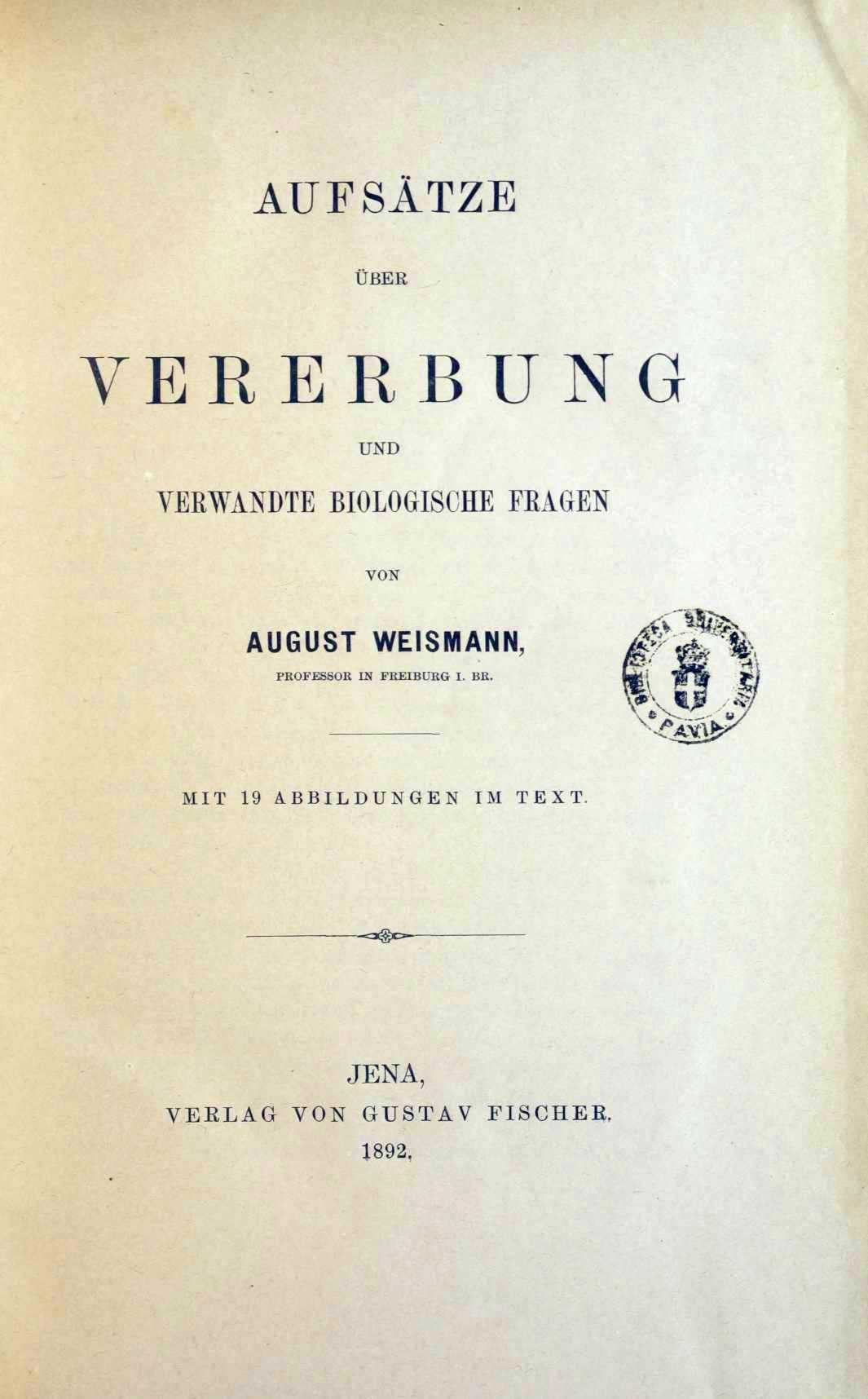
Aufsätze über Vererbung und verwandte biologische Fragen, 1892

- 1868. Über die Berechtigung der Darwin'schen Theorie: Ein akademischer Vortrag gehalten am 8. Juli 1868 in der Aula der Universität zu Freiburg im Breisgau. Engelmann, Leipzig.
- 1872. Über den Einfluß der Isolierung auf die Artbildung. Engelmann, Leipzig.
- 1875. Studien zur Descendenz-Theorie. I. Ueber den Saison-Dimorphismus der Schmetterlinge. Leipzig.
- 1876. Studien zur Descendenztheorie: II. Ueber die letzten Ursachen der Transmutationen. Leipzig.
- 1883. Die Entstehung der Sexualzellen bei den Hydromedusen: Zugleich ein Beitrag zur Kenntniss des Baues und der Lebenserscheinungen dieser Gruppe. Fischer, Jena.
- 1883. Entstehung der Sexualzellen bei den Hydromedusen (in German). Vol. 1. Jena: Fischer.
- 1883. Entstehung der Sexualzellen bei den Hydromedusen (in German). Vol. 2. Jena: Fischer.
- 1885. Die Continuität des Keimplasmas als Grundlage einer Theorie der Vererbung. Fischer, Jena.
- 1886. "Ueber den Rückschritt in der Natur". Deutsche Rundschau. 48: 437.
- 1887. Zur Frage nach der Vererbung erworbener Eigenschaften. In: Biol. Zbl. 6:33–48
- 1887. Über die Zahl der Richtungskörper und über ihre Bedeutung für die Vererbung. Fischer, Jena.
- 1889 Translations: Essays upon Heredity Oxford Clarendon Press – Full online text
- 1892. Das Keimplasma: eine Theorie der Vererbung. Fischer, Jena.
- 1893 Translation: Germ-Plasm, a theory of Heredity Charles Scribner's Sons – Full online text
- 1892. Aufsätze über Vererbung und angewandet biologische Fragen. Fischer, Jena.
- 1893. Die Allmacht der Naturzüchtung: eine Erwiderung an Herbert Spencer. Jena. Translated and published in the Contemporary Review, 1893. The all-sufficiency of natural selection. A reply to Herbert Spencer. Contemporary Review 64: 309–338
- 1902. Vorträge über Deszendenztheorie: Gehalten an der Universität zu Freiburg im Breisgau. Fischer, Jena. 2 volums

== Sources ==
- Churchill, Frederick B. (1 March 1968). "August Weismann and a break from tradition". Journal of the History of Biology. 1 (1): 91–112. doi:10.1007/BF00149777. S2CID 84694824.
- Churchill, Frederick B. (1 December 1970). "Hertwig, Weismann, and the Meaning of Reduction Division circa 1890". Isis. 61 (4): 429–457. doi:10.1086/350680. PMID 4942056. S2CID 46321527.
- Löther, Rolf 1990. Wegbereiter der Genetik: Gregor Johann Mendel und August Weismann. Verlag Harri Deutsch, Frankfurt am Main. ISBN 3-8171-1130-4
- Risler H. 1968. August Weismann 1834–1914. In: Berichte der Naturforschenden Gesellschaft Freiburg im Breisgau. 77–93
- Risler H. 1985. August Weismanns Leben und Wirken nach Dokumenten aus seinem Nachlass. In: Freiburger Universitätsblätter Heft 87/88, Freiburg. 23–42
- Romanes, George John 1893. An Examination of Weismannism. London, Longmans.
