= Germ plasm =

Biological concept

August Weismann's 1892 germ plasm theory. The hereditary material, the germ plasm, is transmitted only by the gonads. Somatic cells (of the body) develop afresh in each generation from the germ plasm.

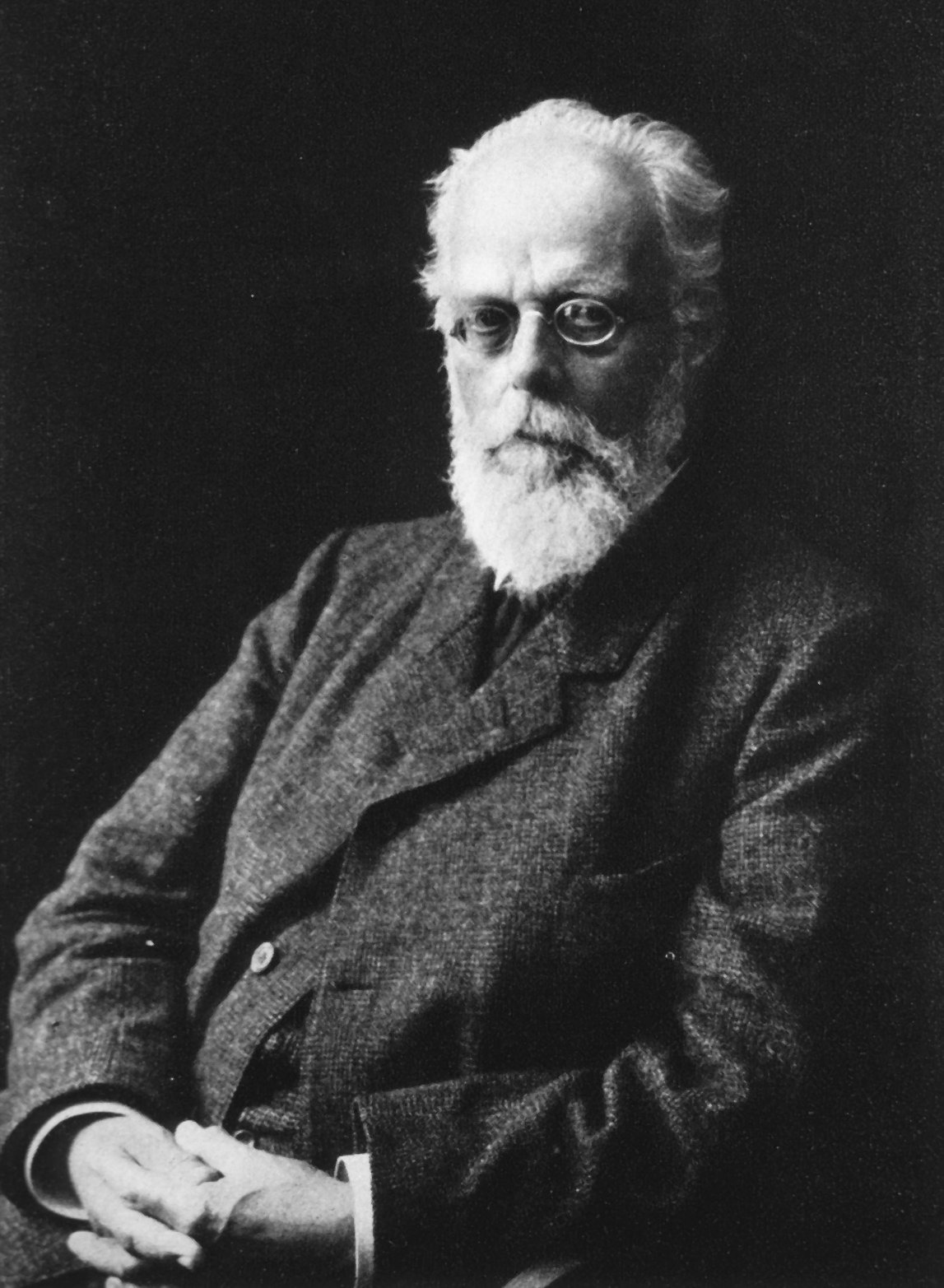
August Weismann proposed the germ plasm theory in the 19th century, before the foundation of modern genetics.

Germ plasm (German: Keimplasma) is a biological concept developed in the 19th century by the German biologist August Weismann. It states that heritable information is transmitted only by germ cells in the gonads (ovaries and testes), not by somatic cells. The related idea that information cannot pass from somatic cells to the germ line, contrary to Lamarckism, is called the Weismann barrier. To some extent this theory anticipated the development of modern genetics.

== History ==
The term Keimplasma (germ plasm) was first used by the German biologist, August Weismann (1834–1914), and described in his 1892 book Das Keimplasma: eine Theorie der Vererbung (The Germ Plasm: a theory of inheritance). His theory states that multicellular organisms consist of germ cells that contain and transmit heritable information, and somatic cells which carry out ordinary bodily functions. In the germ plasm theory, inheritance in a multicellular organism only takes place by means of the germ cells: the gametes, such as egg cells and sperm cells. Other cells of the body do not function as agents of heredity. The effect is one-way: germ cells produce somatic cells, and more germ cells; the germ cells are not affected by anything the somatic cells learn or any ability the body acquires during its life. Genetic information cannot pass from soma to germ plasm and on to the next generation. This is referred to as the Weismann barrier. This idea, if true, rules out the inheritance of acquired characteristics as proposed by Jean-Baptiste Lamarck, like others before him, and accepted by Charles Darwin both in On the Origin of Species and as part of his pangenesis theory of inheritance.

However, a careful reading of Weismann's work over the span of his entire career shows that he had more nuanced views. He insisted, like Darwin, that a variable environment was necessary to cause variation in the hereditary material. Because genetic information cannot pass from soma to germ plasm, these external conditions, he believed, caused different effects on the soma and the germ plasm. Thus, the historian of science Rasmus G. Winther states, Weismann was not a Weismannian, as he, like Darwin, did believe in the inheritance of acquired characteristics, which later came to be known as Lamarckian.

The part of Weismann's theory which proved most vulnerable was his notion that the germ plasm (effectively, genes) was successively reduced during division of somatic cells. As modern genetics developed, it became clear that this idea is wrong in most cases. Cases such as Dolly, the cloned sheep, proved via somatic cell nuclear transfer that adult cells retain a complete set of information – as opposed to Weismann's increasingly determined gradual loss of genetic information – putting this aspect of Weismann's theory to rest as a general rule of metazoan development. However, genetic information is readily lost by somatic cells in some groups of animals through somatic genome processing. The best known example is the nematodes, in which the phenomenon of chromatin diminution was first described by Theodor Boveri in 1887.

The idea was to some extent anticipated in an 1865 article by Francis Galton, published in Macmillan's Magazine, which set out a weak version of the concept. In 1889 Weismann wrote to acknowledge that "You have exposed in your paper an idea which is in one essential point nearly allied to the main idea contained in my theory of the continuity of germ-plasm".

== Modern view ==
The idea of the Weismann barrier, namely that changes acquired during an organism's life cannot affect its offspring, is still broadly accepted. This has been extended into molecular terms as the central dogma of molecular biology, which asserts that information written in the form of proteins cannot be fed back into genetically transmissible information encoded in nucleic acids.

The Weismannian notion that the germ cells are unaffected by somatic cells or their environment is however proving not to be absolute. Chemical modification of the nucleotide bases that constitute the genetic code such as methylation of cytosines as well as modifications of the histones around which DNA is organized into higher-order structures are influenced by the metabolic and physiologic state of the organism and in some cases can be heritable. Such changes are called epigenetic because they do not alter the nucleotide sequence.
