= Sporogonites =

Sporogonites Temporal range: Lower Devonian

Scientific classification
- Kingdom: Plantae
- Clade: Embryophytes
- Clade: Setaphyta
- Division: Bryophyta (?)
- Genus: †Sporogonites; Halle, 1916

Species
- S. exuberans Halle, 1916; (incomplete list)

Extinct genus of Devonian plants

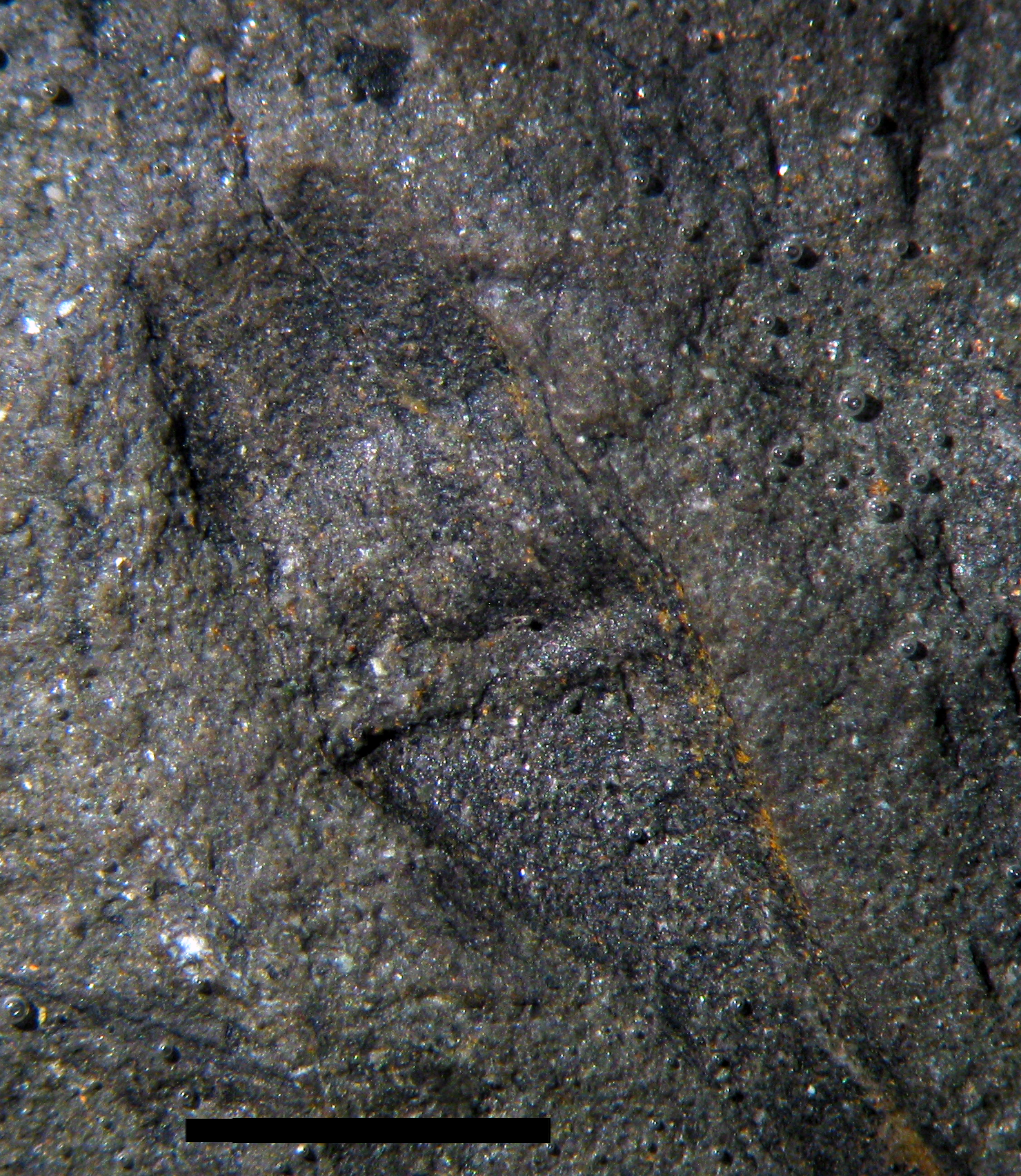
Capsule of Sporogonites excellens Frenguelli 1951

Sporogonites was a genus of Lower Devonian land plant with branching axes. It is known from Europe, Australia and Newfoundland. It resembles a moss in that many straight axes, which grew to about five centimetres in height and possess terminal sporangia, grow from a planar basal surface. Its spores were trilete and around 30 μm across.
