= Gametogonium =

Stem cell that gives rise to a gamete, such as a sperm or egg cell

Gametogonium (plural gametogonia) are stem cells for gametes located within the gonads. They originate from primordial germ cells, which have migrated to the gonads. Male gametogonia which are located within the testes during development and adulthood are called spermatogonium (plural spermatogonia). Female gametogonia, known as oogonium (plural oogonia), are found within the ovaries of the developing foetus and were thought to be depleted at or after birth. Spermatogonia and oogonia are classified as sexually differentiated germ cells.

== Origin ==
Germ cells are specified early in development and can only differentiate into gametes. The segregation of germ cells is often determined by the species, with some undergoing preformation, where the germ cells are determined by maternally inherited factors before or immediately after fertilisation, and others undergoing epigenesis, where the germ cell lineage is determined from signalling from surrounding tissues. Preformation was initially perceived as more common than epigenesis, as it appears in many model organisms like the common fruit fly, roundworms and some amphibians. Epigenesis has since been shown to be the more common mechanism. The specific mechanism of germ line differentiation varies across species.

=== Animal models ===
Mice and other mammalian species undergo epigenesis during development, where germ cells are separated from the somatic lineage during early gastrulation, occurring at embryonic day 7 in mice, and are derived directly from proximal epiblast cells relative to the extraembryonic ectoderm. Prior to gastrulation the epiblast cells are not yet set in their role as cells of the germ lineage and can act as precursors for somatic cells Matsui and Okamura, 2003. At this stage, cells transplanted to the proximal epiblast from other parts of the epiblast can also be differentiated into germ line cells. The potential germ line cells are specified by the extracellular signalling of BMP4, BMP2 and BMP8b from the extraembryonic ectoderm. The germ cell population (~40 in mice), after specification, migrate to the developing gonads where they differentiate further into gametogonia. Much of the research in germ cell development is done on animal models. Animal models are an effective research tool due to the commonality of sexual reproduction which is thought to have same or similar mechanisms across species. The majority of research is done on mice which has led to advances in understanding germ line differentiation across all mammal but there are some species specific mechanisms which have not been studied as extensively due to the difficulty of both obtaining human samples and the ethical limitations of human research. To circumvent that, there have been studies performed on human pluripotent stem cells.

=== Human research ===
Pluripotent stem cells are used in lieu of in vivo cells when researching germ cell development but is not without its issues. There is a limited amount of information on early germ cells, so it is difficult to ascertain if the resultant cells in the culture are the same as germ cells. Instead, research is based on inducing cells with the same or similar properties in order to study the underlying mechanisms of germ cell differentiation. Additionally, it is also difficult to compare with previous studies, especially since the majority have been done on mice, and there are different processes between species.

== The role of the gonads ==
The gonads have an important role in germ cell development, converting the bipotential cells into gametogonia. The germ cells are bipotential in that prior to migrating to the gonads, they are capable of forming either spermatogonia or oogonia. The specification into either female or male fates for the organism itself also depends on the development of the gonads, which have yet to differentiate into either ovaries or testes. In the mouse, somatic sex determination (i.e. determination of either female or male gonads) begins at embryonic day 10.5 in mice, but is not finalised until day 12.5. Male somatic cell specification involves the Y-chromosome specific Sry gene, which regulates the specification of Sertoli cells and Leydig cells. Without the specification of those cells, the gonad formation is regulated by the X-chromosomes, forming the ovaries. After the fate of the gonads is finalised, the sex specification of the germ cells occurs at 12.5-15.5 days. Sex specification of the germ cells requires the repression of pluripotency and relies on the communication between the somatic cells of the gonads and germ cells. The mechanisms for male and female differentiation are markedly different, since a population of sperm producing spermatogonia are retained throughout development and into adult life, unlike oogonia which only produce oocyte in utero. When the germ cells reach the gonads, they undergo proliferation via mitosis and at 13.5 days of rat development they begin to undergo meiosis in the ovary but arrested at the mitotic stage in the testes. In the ovary, after mitosis, the gametogonium undergo meiosis, which is initiated by intrinsic competence factor DazL and extrinsic retinoic acid, excreted by the mesonephros. Retinoic acid is the major factor in meiosis, upregulating genes including ‘‘Stra8’‘, ‘‘Dmc1’‘ and ‘‘Sycp3’‘, which all have a role in meiosis. The male germ cells are protected from external signalling, like retinoic acid from the mesonephros, by the Leydig and Sertoli cells.

== Spermatogonium ==
Spermatogonium are the stem cell population that reside in the testes and undergo spermatogenesis to form sperm. They remain within the testes throughout adulthood.

== Oogonium ==
Oogonium are the stem cells for oocytes, and were previously thought to be depleted during development during the production of the primary oocytes. However, some of these stem cells have been found in the mouse and primate ovaries.
