= Germ cell =

Gamete-producing cell

A germ cell is a cell that gives rise to a gamete, the reproductive cell of an organism that reproduces sexually. In the female animal the resulting gamete is the egg cell, or ovum, and in the male the gamete is the sperm.

In humans and many other animals, the primordial germ cells originate in the primitive streak and migrate via the embryonic hindgut to the genital ridge where the gonads develop. There, they undergo meiosis, followed by cellular differentiation.

It is debated whether primordial germ cells can also originate from the amnion. Unlike animals, plants do not have germ cells designated in early development. Instead, germ cells can arise from somatic cells in the adult, such as the floral meristem of flowering plants.

== Introduction ==
Multicellular eukaryotes are made of two fundamental cell types: germ and somatic cells. Germ cells produce gametes and are the only cells that can undergo meiosis as well as mitosis. Somatic cells are all the other cells that form the building blocks of the body and they only divide by mitosis. The lineage of germ cells is called the germline. Germ cell specification begins during cleavage in many animals or in the epiblast during gastrulation in birds and mammals. After transport, involving passive movements and active migration, germ cells arrive at the developing gonads. In humans, sexual differentiation starts approximately 6 weeks after conception. The end-products of the germ cell cycle are the egg or sperm.

Under special conditions in vitro germ cells can acquire properties similar to those of embryonic stem cells (ESCs). The underlying mechanism of that change is still unknown. These changed cells are then called embryonic germ cells. Both cell types are pluripotent in vitro, but only ESCs have proven pluripotency in vivo. Some studies have demonstrated that it is possible to give rise to primordial germ cells from ESCs.

== Specification ==
There are two mechanisms to establish the germ cell lineage in the embryo. The first way is called preformistic and involves that the cells destined to become germ cells inherit the specific germ cell determinants present in the germ plasm (specific area of the cytoplasm) of the egg (ovum). The unfertilized egg of most animals is asymmetrical: different regions of the cytoplasm contain different amounts of mRNA and proteins.

The second way is found in mammals, where germ cells are not specified by such determinants but by signals controlled by zygotic genes. In mammals, a few cells of the early embryo are induced by signals of neighboring cells to become primordial germ cells. Mammalian eggs are somewhat symmetrical and after the first divisions of the fertilized egg, the produced cells are all totipotent. This means that they can differentiate in any cell type in the body and thus germ cells. Specification of primordial germ cells in the laboratory mouse is initiated by high levels of bone morphogenetic protein (BMP) signaling, which activates expression of the transcription factors Blimp-1/Prdm1 and Prdm14.

It is speculated that induction was the ancestral mechanism, and that the preformistic, or inheritance, mechanism of germ cell establishment arose from convergent evolution. There are several key differences between these two mechanisms that may provide reasoning for the evolution of germ plasm inheritance. One difference is that typically inheritance occurs almost immediately during development (around the blastoderm stage) while induction typically does not occur until gastrulation. As germ cells are quiescent and therefore not dividing, they are not susceptible to mutation.

Since the germ cell lineage is not established right away by induction, there is a higher chance for mutation to occur before the cells are specified. Mutation rate data is available that indicates a higher rate of germ line mutations in mice and humans, species which undergo induction, than in C. elegans and Drosophila melanogaster, species which undergo inheritance. A lower mutation rate would be selected for, which is one possible reason for the convergent evolution of the germ plasm. However, more mutation rate data will need to be collected across several taxa, particularly data collected both before and after the specification of primordial germ cells before this hypothesis on the evolution of germ plasm can be backed by strong evidence.

== Migration ==
Primordial germ cells, germ cells that still have to reach the gonads divide repeatedly by mitosis on their migratory route through the gut and into the developing gonads.

=== Invertebrates ===
In the model organism Drosophila, pole cells passively move from the posterior end of the embryo to the posterior midgut because of the infolding of the blastoderm. Then they actively move through the gut into the mesoderm. Endodermal cells differentiate and together with Wunen proteins they induce the migration through the gut. Wunen proteins are chemorepellents that lead the germ cells away from the endoderm and into the mesoderm. After splitting into two populations, the germ cells continue migrating laterally and in parallel until they reach the gonads. Chemoattractants stimulate the migration in the gonadal mesoderm.

=== Vertebrates ===
In the aquatic frog Xenopus egg, the germ cell determinants are found in the most vegetal blastomeres. These presumptive PGCs are brought to the endoderm of the blastocoel by gastrulation. They are determined as germ cells when gastrulation is completed. Migration from the hindgut along the gut and across the dorsal mesentery then takes place. The germ cells split into two populations and move to the paired gonadal ridges. Migration starts with 3-4 cells that undergo three rounds of cell division so that about 30 PGCs arrive at the gonads. On the migratory path of the PGCs, the orientation of underlying cells and their secreted molecules such as fibronectin play an important role.

Mammals have a migratory path comparable to that in Xenopus. Migration begins with 50 gonocytes and about 5,000 PGCs arrive at the gonads. Proliferation occurs also during migration and lasts for 3–4 weeks in humans.

PGCs come from the epiblast and migrate subsequently into the mesoderm, the endoderm and the posterior of the yolk sac. Migration then takes place from the hindgut along the gut and across the dorsal mesentery to reach the gonads (4.5 weeks in human beings). Fibronectin maps here also a polarized network together with other molecules. The somatic cells on the path of germ cells provide them attractive, repulsive, and survival signals. But germ cells also send signals to each other.

In reptiles and birds, germ cells use another path. PGCs come from the epiblast and move to the hypoblast to form the germinal crescent (anterior extraembryonic structure). The gonocytes then squeeze into blood vessels and use the circulatory system for transport. They squeeze out of the vessels when they are at height of the gonadal ridges. Cell adhesion on the endothelium of the blood vessels and molecules such as chemoattractants are probably involved in helping PGCs migrate.

==== The Sry gene of the Y chromosome ====
The sex determining region of the Y chromosome (SRY) directs male development in mammals by inducing the somatic cells of the gonadal ridge to develop into a testis, rather than an ovary. Sry is expressed in a small group of somatic cells of the gonads and influences these cells to become Sertoli cells (supporting cells in testis). Sertoli cells are responsible for sexual development along a male pathway in many ways. One of these ways involves stimulation of the arriving primordial cells to differentiate into sperm. In the absence of the Sry gene, primordial germ cells differentiate into eggs. Removing genital ridges before they start to develop into testes or ovaries results in the development of a female, independent of the carried sex chromosome.

==== Retinoic acid and Germ cell differentiation ====
Retinoic acid (RA) is an important factor that causes differentiation of primordial germ cells. In males, the mesonephros releases retinoic acid. RA then goes to the gonad causing an enzyme called CYP26B1 to be released by sertoli cells. CYP26B1 metabolizes RA, and because sertoli cells surround primordial germ cells (PGCs), PGCs never come into contact with RA, which results in a lack of proliferation of PGCs and no meiotic entry. This keeps spermatogenesis from starting too soon. In females, the mesonephros releases RA, which enters the gonad. RA stimulates Stra8, a critical gatekeeper of meiosis (1), and Rec8, causing primordial germ cells to enter meiosis. This causes the development of oocytes that arrest in meiosis I.

== Gametogenesis ==
Gametogenesis, the development of diploid germ cells into either haploid egg cells, or sperm cells (respectively oogenesis and spermatogenesis) is different for each species but the general stages are similar. Oogenesis and spermatogenesis have many features in common, they both involve:

- Meiosis
- Extensive morphological differentiation
- Incapacity of surviving for very long if fertilization does not occur

Despite their homologies they also have major differences:

- Spermatogenesis has equivalent meiotic divisions resulting in four equivalent spermatids while oogenic meiosis is asymmetrical: only one egg is formed together with a first and second polar bodies.
- Different timing of maturation: oogenic meiosis is interrupted at one or more stages (for a long time) while spermatogenic meiosis is rapid and uninterrupted.

=== Oogenesis ===
After migration primordial germ cells will become oogonia in the forming gonad (ovary). The oogonia proliferate extensively by mitotic divisions, up to 5-7 million cells in humans. But then many of these oogonia die and about 50,000 remain. These cells differentiate into primary oocytes. In week 11-12 fertilization age the first meiotic division begins (before birth for most mammals) and remains arrested in prophase I from a few days to many years depending on the species. It is in this period or in some cases at the beginning of sexual maturity that the primary oocytes secrete proteins to form a coat called zona pellucida and they also produce cortical granules containing enzymes and proteins needed for fertilization. Meiosis stands by because of the follicular granulosa cells that send inhibitory signals through gap junctions and the zona pellucida. Sexual maturation is the beginning of periodic ovulation. Ovulation is the regular release of one oocyte from the ovary into the reproductive tract and is preceded by follicular growth. A few follicle cells are stimulated to grow but only one oocyte is ovulated. A primordial follicle consists of an epithelial layer of follicular granulosa cells enclosing an oocyte. The pituitary gland secrete follicle-stimulating hormones (FSHs) that stimulate follicular growth and oocyte maturation. The thecal cells around each follicle secrete estrogen. This hormone stimulates the production of FSH receptors on the follicular granulosa cells and has at the same time a negative feedback on FSH secretion. This results in a competition between the follicles and only the follicle with the most FSH receptors survives and is ovulated. Meiotic division I goes on in the ovulated oocyte stimulated by luteinizing hormones (LHs) produced by the pituitary gland. FSH and LH block the gap junctions between follicle cells and the oocyte therefore inhibiting communication between them. Most follicular granulosa cells stay around the oocyte and so form the cumulus layer. Large non-mammalian oocytes accumulate egg yolk, glycogen, lipids, ribosomes, and the mRNA needed for protein synthesis during early embryonic growth. These intensive RNA biosynthese are mirrored in the structure of the chromosomes, which decondense and form lateral loops giving them a lampbrush appearance (see Lampbrush chromosome). Oocyte maturation is the following phase of oocyte development. It occurs at sexual maturity when hormones stimulate the oocyte to complete meiotic division I. The meiotic division I produces 2 cells differing in size: a small polar body and a large secondary oocyte. The secondary oocyte undergoes meiotic division II and that results in the formation of a second small polar body and a large mature egg, both being haploid cells. The polar bodies degenerate. Oocyte maturation stands by at metaphase II in most vertebrates. During ovulation, the arrested secondary oocyte leaves the ovary and matures rapidly into an egg ready for fertilization. Fertilization will cause the egg to complete meiosis II. In human females there is proliferation of the oogonia in the fetus, meiosis starts then before birth and stands by at meiotic division I up to 50 years, ovulation begins at puberty.

==== Egg growth ====
A 10 - 20 μm large somatic cell generally needs 24 hours to double its mass for mitosis. By this way it would take a very long time for that cell to reach the size of a mammalian egg with a diameter of 100 μm (some insects have eggs of about 1,000 μm or greater). Eggs have therefore special mechanisms to grow to their large size. One of these mechanisms is to have extra copies of genes: meiotic division I is paused so that the oocyte grows while it contains two diploid chromosome sets. Some species produce many extra copies of genes, such as amphibians, which may have up to 1 or 2 million copies. A complementary mechanism is partly dependent on syntheses of other cells. In amphibians, birds, and insects, yolk is made by the liver (or its equivalent) and secreted into the blood. Neighboring accessory cells in the ovary can also provide nutritive help of two types. In some invertebrates some oogonia become nurse cells. These cells are connected by cytoplasmic bridges with oocytes. The nurse cells of insects provide oocytes macromolecules such as proteins and mRNA. Follicular granulosa cells are the second type of accessory cells in the ovary in both invertebrates and vertebrates. They form a layer around the oocyte and nourish them with small molecules, no macromolecules, but eventually their smaller precursor molecules, by gap junctions.

==== Mutation and DNA repair ====
The mutation frequency of female germline cells in mice is about 5-fold lower than that of somatic cells, according to one study.

The mouse oocyte in the dictyate (prolonged diplotene) stage of meiosis actively repairs DNA damage, whereas DNA repair was not detected in the pre-dictyate (leptotene, zygotene and pachytene) stages of meiosis. The long period of meiotic arrest at the four chromatid dictyate stage of meiosis may facilitate recombinational repair of DNA damages.

=== Spermatogenesis ===
Spermatogenesis is representative for most mammals. In human males, spermatogenesis begins at puberty in seminiferous tubules in the testicles and carries on continuously. Spermatogonia are immature germ cells. They proliferate continuously by mitotic divisions around the outer edge of the seminiferous tubules, next to the basal lamina. Some of these cells stop proliferation and differentiate into primary spermatocytes. After they proceed through the first meiotic division, two secondary spermatocytes are produced. The two secondary spermatocytes undergo the second meiotic division to form four haploid spermatids. These spermatids differentiate morphologically into sperm by nuclear condensation, ejection of the cytoplasm and formation of the acrosome and flagellum.

The developing male germ cells do not complete cytokinesis during spermatogenesis. Consequently, cytoplasmic bridges exist during interphase to ensure connection between the clones of differentiating daughter cells. These bridges are called a syncytium, and feature a TEX14 and KIF23 ring in their centre. In this way the haploid cells are supplied with all the products of a complete diploid genome. Sperm that carry a Y chromosome, for example, are supplied with essential molecules that are encoded by genes on the X chromosome.

Success of germ cell proliferation and differentiation is also ensured by a balance between germ cell development and programmed cell death. Identification of «death triggering signals» and corresponding receptor proteins is important for the fertilization potential of males. Apoptosis in germ cells can be induced by variety of naturally occurring toxicant. Receptors belonging to the taste 2 family are specialized to detect bitter compounds including extremely toxic alkaloids. So taste receptors play a functional role for controlling apoptosis in male reproductive tissue.

==== Mutation and DNA repair ====
The mutation frequencies for cells throughout the different stages of spermatogenesis in mice is similar to that in female germline cells, that is 5 to 10-fold lower than the mutation frequency in somatic cells Thus low mutation frequency is a feature of germline cells in both sexes. Homologous recombinational repair of double-strand breaks occurs in mouse during sequential stages of spermatogenesis, but is most prominent in spermatocytes. The lower frequencies of mutation in germ cells compared to somatic cells appears to be due to more efficient removal of DNA damages by repair processes including homologous recombination repair during meiosis. Mutation frequency during spermatogenesis increases with age. The mutations in spermatogenic cells of old mice include an increased prevalence of transversion mutations compared to young and middle-aged mice.

== Clinical significance ==
Germ cell tumor is a rare cancer that can affect people at all ages. As of 2018, germ cell tumors account for 3% of all cancers in children and adolescents 0–19 years old.

Germ cell tumors are generally located in the gonads but can also appear in the abdomen, pelvis, mediastinum, or brain. Germ cells migrating to the gonads may not reach that intended destination and a tumor can grow wherever they end up, but the exact cause is still unknown. These tumors can be benign or malignant.

On arrival at the gonad, primordial germ cells that do not properly differentiate may produce germ cell tumors of the ovary or testis in a mouse model.

== Induced differentiation ==
Inducing differentiation of certain cells to germ cells has many applications. One implication of induced differentiation is that it may allow for the eradication of male and female factor infertility. Furthermore, it would allow same-sex couples to have biological children if sperm could be produced from female cells or if eggs could be produced from male cells. Efforts to create sperm and eggs from skin and embryonic stem cells were pioneered by Hayashi and Saitou's research group at Kyoto University. These researchers produced primordial germ cell-like cells (PGLCs) from embryonic stem cells (ESCs) and skin cells in vitro.

Hayashi and Saitou's group was able to promote the differentiation of embryonic stem cells into PGCs with the use of precise timing and bone morphogenetic protein 4 (Bmp4). Upon succeeding with embryonic stem cells, the group was able to successfully promote the differentiation of induced pluripotent stem cells (iPSCs) into PGLCs. These primordial germ cell-like cells were then used to create spermatozoa and oocytes.

Efforts for human cells are less advanced due to the fact that the PGCs formed by these experiments are not always viable. In fact Hayashi and Saitou's method is only one third as effective as current in vitro fertilization methods, and the produced PGCs are not always functional. Furthermore, not only are the induced PGCs not as effective as naturally occurring PGCs, but they are also less effective at erasing their epigenetic markers when they differentiate from iPSCs or ESCs to PGCs.

There are also other applications of induced differentiation of germ cells. Another study showed that culture of human embryonic stem cells in mitotically inactivated porcine ovarian fibroblasts (POF) causes differentiation into germ cells, as evidenced by gene expression analysis.

== See also ==
- Germline development
- List of human cell types derived from the germ layers
- Germ cell tumor
