= Somatic cell =

Any biological cell forming the body of an organism

In cellular biology, a somatic cell (from Ancient Greek σῶμα (sôma) 'body'), or vegetal cell, is any biological cell forming the body of a multicellular organism other than a gamete, germ cell, gametocyte or undifferentiated stem cell. Somatic cells compose the body of an organism and divide through mitosis.

In contrast, gametes derive from meiosis within the germ cells of the germline and they fuse during sexual reproduction. Stem cells also can divide through mitosis, but are different from somatic in that they differentiate into diverse specialized cell types.

In mammals, somatic cells make up all the internal organs, skin, bones, blood and connective tissue, while germ cells give rise to spermatozoa and ova which fuse during fertilization to produce a cell called a zygote, which divides and differentiates into the cells of an embryo. There are approximately 220 types of somatic cells in the human body.

Theoretically, these cells are not germ cells (the source of gametes); they transmit their mutations, to their cellular descendants (if they have any), but not to the organism's descendants. However, in sponges, non-differentiated somatic cells form the germ line and, in Cnidaria, differentiated somatic cells are the source of the germline. Mitotic cell division is only seen in diploid somatic cells. Only some cells like germ cells take part in reproduction.

== Evolution ==
As multicellularity was theorized to be evolved many times, so did sterile somatic cells. The evolution of an immortal germline producing specialized somatic cells involved the emergence of mortality, and can be viewed in its simplest version in volvocine algae. Those species with a separation between sterile somatic cells and a germline are called Weismannists. Weismannist development is relatively rare (e.g., vertebrates, arthropods, Volvox), as many species have the capacity for somatic embryogenesis (e.g., land plants, most algae, and numerous invertebrates).

== Genetics and chromosomes ==
Like all cells, somatic cells contain DNA arranged in chromosomes. If a somatic cell contains chromosomes arranged in pairs, it is called diploid and the organism is called a diploid organism. The gametes of diploid organisms contain only single unpaired chromosomes and are called haploid. Each pair of chromosomes comprises one chromosome inherited from the father and one inherited from the mother. In humans, somatic cells contain 46 chromosomes organized into 23 pairs. By contrast, gametes of diploid organisms contain only half as many chromosomes. In humans, this is 23 unpaired chromosomes. When two gametes (i.e. a spermatozoon and an ovum) meet during conception, they fuse together, creating a zygote. Due to the fusion of the two gametes, a human zygote contains 46 chromosomes (i.e. 23 pairs).

A large number of species have the chromosomes in their somatic cells arranged in fours ("tetraploid") or even sixes ("hexaploid"). Thus, they can have diploid or even triploid germline cells. An example of this is the modern cultivated species of wheat, Triticum aestivum L., a hexaploid species whose somatic cells contain six copies of every chromatid.

The frequency of spontaneous mutations is significantly lower in advanced male germ cells than in somatic cell types from the same individual. Female germ cells also show a mutation frequency that is lower than that in corresponding somatic cells and similar to that in male germ cells. These findings appear to reflect employment of more effective mechanisms to limit the initial occurrence of spontaneous mutations in germ cells than in somatic cells. Such mechanisms likely include elevated levels of DNA repair enzymes that ameliorate most potentially mutagenic DNA damages.

== Cloning ==
Schematic model of somatic cell nuclear transfer. This technique has been used to create clones of an organism or in therapeutic medicine.

In recent years, the technique of cloning whole organisms has been developed in mammals, allowing almost identical genetic clones of an animal to be produced. One method of doing this is called "somatic cell nuclear transfer" and involves removing the nucleus from a somatic cell, usually a skin cell. This nucleus contains all of the genetic information needed to produce the organism it was removed from. This nucleus is then injected into an ovum of the same species which has had its own genetic material removed. The ovum now no longer needs to be fertilized, because it contains the correct amount of genetic material (a diploid number of chromosomes). In theory, the ovum can be implanted into the uterus of a same-species animal and allowed to develop. The resulting animal will be a nearly genetically identical clone to the animal from which the nucleus was taken. The only difference is caused by any mitochondrial DNA that is retained in the ovum, which is different from the cell that donated the nucleus. In practice, this technique has so far been problematic, although there have been a few high-profile successes, such as Dolly the Sheep (July 5, 1996 - February 14, 2003) and, more recently, Snuppy (April 24, 2005 - May 2015), the first cloned dog.

== Biobanking ==
Somatic cells have also been collected in the practice of biobanking. The cryoconservation of animal genetic resources is a means of conserving animal genetic material in response to decreasing ecological biodiversity. As populations of organisms fall so does their genetic diversity. This places species long-term survivability at risk. Biobanking aims to preserve biologically viable cells through long-term storage for later use. Somatic cells have been stored with the hopes that they can be reprogrammed into induced pluripotent stem cells (iPSCs), which can then differentiate into viable reproductive cells.

== Genetic modifications ==
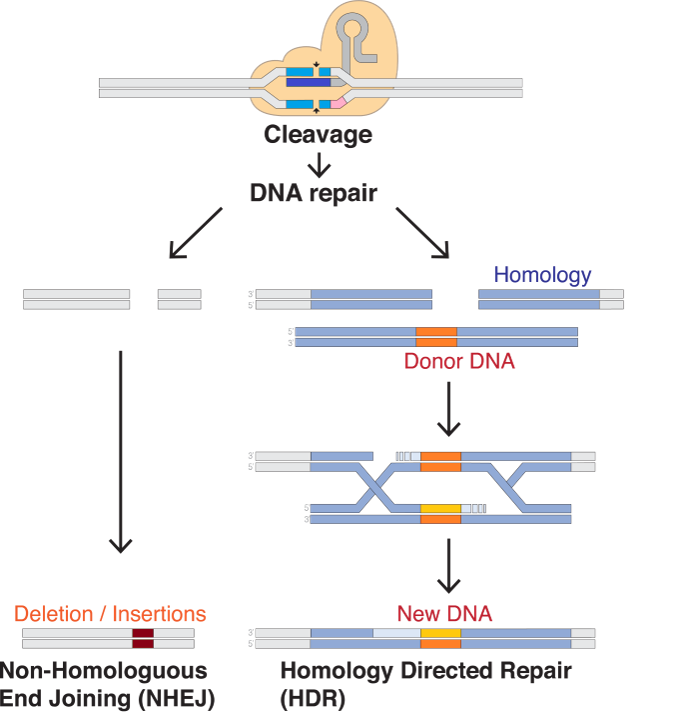
Schematic of CRISPR based gene editing technique

Development of biotechnology has allowed for the genetic manipulation of somatic cells, whether for the modelling of chronic disease or for the prevention of malaise conditions. Two current means of gene editing are the use of transcription activator-like effector nucleases (TALENs) or clustered regularly interspaced short palindromic repeats (CRISPR).

Genetic engineering of somatic cells has resulted in some controversies, although the International Summit on Human Gene Editing has released a statement in support of genetic modification of somatic cells, as the modifications thereof are not passed on to offspring.

== Cellular aging ==
In mammals a high level of repair and maintenance of cellular DNA appears to be beneficial early in life. However, some types of cell, such as those of the brain and muscle, undergo a transition from mitotic cell division to a post-mitotic (non-dividing) condition during early development, and this transition is accompanied by a reduction in DNA repair capability. This reduction may be an evolutionary adaptation permitting the diversion of cellular resources that were earlier used for DNA repair, as well as for DNA replication and cell division, to higher priority neuronal and muscular functions. An effect of these reductions is to allow increased accumulation of DNA damage likely contributing to cellular aging.

== See also ==
- Somatic cell count
- List of biological development disorders
