= Gonocyte =

Gonocytes are the precursors of spermatogonia that differentiate in the testis from primordial germ cells around week 7 of embryonic development and exist up until the postnatal period, when they become spermatogonia. Germ cells operate as vehicles of inheritance by transferring genetic and epigenetic information from one generation to the next. Male fertility is centered around continual spermatogonia which is dependent upon a high stem cell population. Thus, the function and quality of a differentiated sperm cell is dependent upon the capacity of its originating spermatogonial stem cell (SSC).

Gonocytes represent the germ cells undergoing the successive, short-term and migratory stages of development. This occurs between the time they inhabit the forming gonads on the genital ridge to the time they migrate to the basement membrane of the seminiferous cords. Gonocyte development consists of several phases of cell proliferation, differentiation, migration and apoptosis. The abnormal development of gonocytes leads to fertility-related diseases.

They are also identified as prespermatogonia, prospermatogonia and primitive germ cells, although gonocyte is most common.

== History ==
Gonocytes are described as large and spherical, with a prominent nucleus and two nucleoli. The term, gonocyte, was created in 1957 by Canadian scientists Yves Clermont and Bernard Perey. They considered it essential to study the origin of spermatogonia and carried out a study on rats to investigate this. In 1987, Clermont referred to gonocytes as the cells that differentiate into type A spermatogonia, which differentiate into type B spermatogonia and spermatocytes.

Very few studies used gonocytes to also refer to the female germ cells in the ovarium primordium. The specification of gonocytes to be confined to male germ cells occurred after foundational differences between the mechanisms of male and female fetal germ cells were uncovered. Some scientists prefer the terms "prospermatogonia" and "prespermatogonia" for their functional clarity.

Later studies found that the process from primordial germ cell to spermatogonial development is gradual, without clear gene expression markers to distinguish the precursor cells. A 2006 study found that some gonocytes differentiate straight into committed spermatogonia (type B) rather than spermatogonial stem cells (type A).

== Origin of spermatogonial stem cell pool ==
Gonocytes are long-lived precursor germ cells responsible for the production of spermatogonial stem cells (SSCs). Gonocytes relate to both fetal and neonatal germ cells from the point at which they enter the testis primordial until they reach the base membrane at the seminiferous cords and differentiate. At the time of gastrulation, certain cells are set aside for later gamete development. These cells are called post migratory germ cells (PGCs). The gonocyte population develops from the post migratory germ cells (PGCs) around embryonic day (ED) 15. At this point of development, PGCs become dormant and remain inactivated until birth. Shortly after birth, the cell cycle continues and the production of postnatal spermatogonia commences. Gonocytes migrate to the basement membrane to proliferate. Gonocytes that do not migrate undergo apoptosis and are cleared from the seminiferous epithelium. Spermatogonia are formed in infancy and differentiate throughout adult life.

== Formation of spermatogonial lineage ==
There are currently two proposed models for the formation of the spermatogonial lineage during neonatal development. Both models theorize that the gonocyte population develops from a subset of post migratory germ cells (PGCs) but, differ in the proposed subsets of derived gonocytes. One of the models proposes that the PGCs give rise to a single subset of pluripotent gonocytes that either become SSCs from which progenitors then arise or differentiate into type A spermatogonia directly. The other model proposes that the PGCs give rise to multiple predetermined subsets of gonocytes that produce the foundational SSC pool, initial progenitor spermatogonial population, and initial differentiating type A spermatogonia.

== Development ==
The development of germ cells can be divided into two phases. The first phases involves the fetal and neonatal phases of germ cell development that lead to the formation of the SSCs. The second phase is spermatogenesis, which is a cycle of regulated mitosis, meiosis and differentiation (via spermiogenesis) leading to the production of mature spermatozoa, also known as sperm cells.

Gonocytes are functionally present during the first phase of germ cell maturation and development. This period consists of the primordial germ cells (PGC), the initial cells that commence germ cell development in the embryo, and the gonocytes, which after being differentiated from PGCs, undergo regulated proliferation, differentiation, migration and apoptosis to produce the SSCs. Gonocytes therefore correspond to the developmental stages between the PGCs and SSCs.

=== Formation ===
Gonocytes are formed from the differentiation of PGCs. Embryonic cells initiate germ cell development in the proximal epiblast located near the extra-embryonic ectoderm by the release of bone morphogenetic protein 4 (BMP4) and BMP8b. These proteins specify embryonic cells into PGCs expressing the genes PRDM1 and PRDM14 at embryonic day (E) 6.25. The PGCs which are positively stained by alkaline phosphatase and expressing Stella at E7.25 are also specified. In between E7.5 and E12.5, these PGCs migrate towards the genital ridge, where they form the testicular cords, via the cytokine interactions of the CXCR4 and c-Kit membrane receptors and their ligands SDF1 and SCF respectively. During this migratory period, PGCs undergo epigenetic reprogramming through genome-wide DNA demethylation. Once resident in the genital ridge, these germ cells and surrounding supporting cells undergo sex determination driven by the expression of the SRY gene. It is only after these developmental steps that the germ cells present in the developed testicular cords are identified as gonocytes.

=== Proliferation ===
In order to provide the long-term production of sperm, gonocytes undergo proliferation to produce a populate pool of SSCs. Once enclosed by Sertoli cells to form the testicular cords, gonocytes undergo a succession of differing fetal and neonatal periods of mitosis, with a phase of quiescence in between. The mitotic activity that occurs in the neonatal period is necessary for the migration of gonocytes to the basement membrane of the seminiferous cords in order to differentiate into the SSCs. As many populations of gonocytes are in different stages of development, mitotic and quiescent gonocytes coexist in neonatal developing testes.

Proliferation in fetal and neonatal gonocytes is differently regulated. Retinoic acid (RA), the bioactive metabolite of retinal, is a morphogen shown to modulate fetal gonocyte proliferation. Investigation of fetal gonocyte activity in organ cultures recorded RA to slightly stimulate proliferation. Moreover, RA inhibited differentiation by stopping the fetal gonocytes from entering mitotic arrest while simultaneously triggering apoptosis. RA, by decreasing the overall fetal gonocyte population via apoptosis, is speculated to allow the elimination of mutated and dysfunctional germ cells. The activation of protein kinase C by phorbol ester PMA also decreased fetal gonocyte mitotic activity.

There are a number of factors that influence neonatal gonocyte proliferation, including 17β‐estradiol (E2), Leukemia inhibitory factor (LIF), platelet-derived growth factor (PDGF)-BB, and RA. The production of PDGF-BB and E2 by surrounding Sertoli cells activate their respective receptors on neonatal gonocytes, triggering proliferation via an interactive, crosstalk mechanism. The regulation of LIF is speculated to allow gonocytes to become sensitive to Sertoli cell factors that trigger proliferation, such as PDGF-BB and E2. Compared to fetal gonocytes, RA exerts a similar functional role in neonatal gonocytes; It simultaneously stimulates proliferation and apoptosis for regulation of gonocyte and future SSCs population.

=== Migration ===
The migration of gonocytes to the basement membrane of the seminiferous cords is necessary for their differentiation into SSCs. This process is regulated by different factors.

Various studies provide comprehensive comparison of the expression of c-Kit on the membrane of cells and migratory-related behavior, for example PGCs. Although c-Kit expression is evident in a small fraction of neonatal gonocytes, they also express of PDGF receptor beta (PDGFRβ) on their membrane to aid in their migration. Inhibition of PDGF receptors and c-Kit by in vivo treatment of imatinib, an inhibitory drug, interrupted migration, leading to a number of gonocytes centrally located in the seminiferous cords.

The ADAM-Integrin-Tetraspanin complexes, which is a family of proteins, also mediate gonocyte migration. These complexes consist of various proteins that bind to integrins found on the basement membrane of the seminiferous cords and at locations where spermatogonia normally reside, allowing the gonocyte to migrate and bind to the basement membrane.

=== Differentiation ===
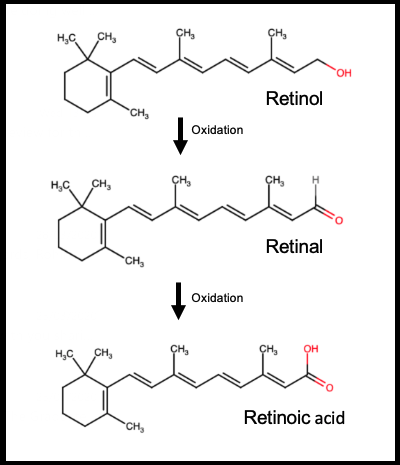
Oxidation reactions required for retinol to become retinoic acid in the gonocyte cell

The differentiation of gonocytes to SSC only occur once the cells have established close contact with the basement membrane in the seminiferous cords. RA is the best characterised activator of gonocyte differentiation. De novo synthesis of RA involves retinol, the precursor to RA, being transported to the membrane receptor STRA6 by the retinol-binding protein released by Sertoli cells. Binding of retinol to STRA6 endocytoses retinol into the cell, whereby it undergoes oxidation reactions to form RA. RA is also directly transported from the surrounding Sertoli cells or the vasculature. RA internalization triggers a variety of pathways that modulate the differentiation, such as PDGF receptor pathways and Janus kinase 2 (JAK2) signaling pathway.

Anti-Müllerian hormone (AMH), a glycoprotein gonadal hormone produced by Sertoli cells in early development, is the only hormone to significantly increase the number of successfully differentiated gonocytes.

The timing of differentiation is regulated by NOTCH signaling. The functional components of the NOTCH signaling pathway are expressed and released by both developing and adult Sertoli cells. Activation of the signaling pathway is crucial for gonocyte development as it triggers gonocytes to depart from quiescence and enter into differentiation. Over activation of the pathway allows effective inhibition of quiescence and gonocyte differentiation.

== Structure of gonocytes ==
Gonocytes are large cells with a spherical euchromatic nucleus, two nucleoli and a surrounding, ring-like cytosol. Throughout the majority of their developmental period, gonocytes are structurally supported by the cytoplasmic extensions of surrounding Sertoli cells and are suspended by Sertoli cell nuclei from the basement membrane. Gonocytes are attached to Sertoli cells by gap junctions, desmosome junctions and a number of different cell adhesion molecules such as connexin 43, PB-cadherin and NCAM for regulation of cell-to-cell communication. Gonocytes dissociate from these junctions and migrate so that the basal side of the cell is in close proximity with the basement membrane, where they undergo phenotypic changes and take the appearance of spermatogonia.

== Diseases ==
Dysfunctional development in germ cells plays a significant role in fertility-related diseases. The development of PGCs to gonocytes, and gonocyte differentiation to SSCs is critical for adult fertility and the defective growth often leads to infertility.

=== Testicular cancer ===
Testicular germ cell tumors, that occur primarily in young adults, are the consequent of preinvasive cells called carcinoma in situ (CIS). The development of CIS is due to fetal germ cells, such as gonocytes, arrested in quiescence and unable to properly differentiate. This leads to malignant transformation of the germ cells until it becomes an overt germ cell cancer after puberty.

=== Cryptorchidism ===
Cryptorchidism, also known as undescended testis, is a common birth defect affecting male genital formation. Individuals diagnosed with cryptorchidism are often at risk of testicular cancer and infertility due to dysfunction in the development of the neonatal germ cells, in particular, the disruption of the differentiation of gonocytes into adult dark-spermatogonia. It is proposed that this dysfunction is a product of heat stress caused by the undescended testes remaining in the abdomen and unable to regulate its temperature which is often accomplished by the scrotum.
