= Germinal epithelium (male) =

Epithelial layer of the seminiferous tubules

- Germinal epithelium of the testicle. 1 basal lamina, 2 spermatogonia, 3 spermatocyte 1st order, 4 spermatocyte 2nd order, 5 spermatid, 6 mature spermatid, 7 Sertoli cell, 8 tight junction (blood testis barrier)

Identifiers
- MeSH: D012670

The germinal epithelium is the epithelial layer of the seminiferous tubules of the testicles. It is also known as the wall of the seminiferous tubules. The cells in the epithelium are connected via tight junctions.

There are two types of cells in the germinal epithelium. The large Sertoli cells (not dividing) function as supportive cells to the developing sperm. The second cell type is the cells belonging to the spermatogenic cell lineage. These eventually develop into sperm cells (spermatozoon). Typically, the spermatogenic cells will make four to eight layers in the germinal epithelium.
