= Peritubular myoid cell =

Smooth muscle cell found in testis

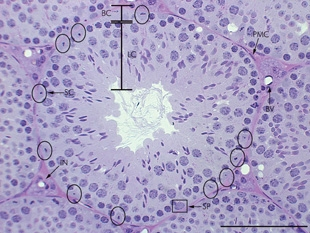
- Peritubular myoid cells in the adult mouse testis

Details
- System: Reproductive, muscular
- Location: Testis
- Function: Contraction and transport of spermatoza through the tubules of the testis

A peritubular myoid (PTM) cell is one of the smooth muscle cells which surround the seminiferous tubules in the testis. These cells are present in all mammals but their organization and abundance varies between species. The exact role of PTM cells is still somewhat uncertain and further work into this is needed. However, a number of functions of these cells have been established. They are contractile cells which contain actin filaments and are primarily involved in transport of spermatozoa through the tubules. They provide structural integrity to the tubules through their involvement in laying down the basement membrane. This has also been shown to affect Sertoli cell function and PTM cells also communicate with Sertoli cells through the secretion of growth factors and ECM (extra-cellular matrix) components. Studies have shown PTM cells to be critical in achieving normal spermatogenesis. Overall, PTM cells have a role in both maintaining the structure of the tubules and regulating spermatogenesis through cellular interaction.

== Structure ==
PTM cells are endothelial cells which are understood to have derived from mesonephric cells. The structure and organization between PTM cells have been observed to be distinctly different between mammalian species. In humans, PTM cells are spindle shaped and form several thin elongated layers, approximately 5-7 cell layers, and surround Sertoli cells.

These are detected in the lamina propria of the seminiferous tubule and immunohistochemical studies have shown functional distinctions between these layers. The inner layers have been shown to express desmin, a smooth muscle phenotype, whereas the outer layers express vimentin, a connective tissue phenotype.

In rodents, PTM cells are one layer thick. Both human and rodent PTM cells are joined by junctional complexes.

== Function ==
=== Contractile ===
Peritubular myoid cells are responsible for the contractile nature of the seminiferous tubule. This contraction helps move the spermatozoa and fluid to the rete testes. There are a number of mediators involved in the regulation of contraction. Oxytocin produced by leydig cells has been shown to be a driving factor in the contractions by acting on peritubular myoid cells. As no oxytocin receptors are found on the peritubular myoid cells it is thought the oxytocin causes the activation of the vasopressin receptors. However, the full mechanisms behind the contractibility are unknown. Other factors including transforming growth factor b, prostaglandins and nitric oxide are also thought to be involved.

=== Spermatogonial stem cell self-renewal ===
Peritubular myoid cells play a crucial role in the self-renewal and maintenance of the spermatogonial stem cell (SSC) population. For those SSCs destined to form differentiating progenitor A1 spermatogonia (and hence spermatozoa), this is initiated at a defined stage during the spermatogenic cycle. The precise location of SSCs throughout various staged cohorts of the seminiferous tubule determines their renewal function, to continuously produce progeny. During stages II and IV of spermatogenesis, GDNF is secreted by peritubular myoid cells upon testosterone binding the androgen receptor (in contrast to GDNF secretion by the Sertoli cells during stages IX and I). Following this, GDNF binds GFRA1 on spermatogonial stem cells, and RET co-receptor (a transmembrane tyrosine kinase) is consequently signalled throughout all undifferentiated spermatogonia. Thus, SFK signalling is upregulated and genes encoding key transcription factors (bcl6b, brachyury, Id4, Lhx1) become activated. The histochemical marker, alkaline phosphatase (stimulated by testosterone and retinol) has been useful for investigating peritubular myoid cell function and differentiation, as it has been shown to have activity in the peritubular myoid cell of the rat.

== Differentiation ==
PTMs become recognisable at 12 weeks gestation in humans, and 13.5 days post conception in mice. However, where they arise from is currently unclear. Previous studies suggested that PTMs originate from a group of cells called mesonephric cells, which migrate into the developing gonad from an adjacent area called the mesonephric primordia. It was thought that the mesonephric cells would then have one of three fates: becoming Leydig cells, vascular tissue or myoid cells. Those becoming myoid cells would sit on a basement membrane surrounding the developing seminiferous tubules.

However, more recent evidence has found that mesonephric cells do not give rise to PTMs but instead have only a vascular fate, leaving more uncertainty over where PTMs come from. The main difficulty in studying the development of PTMs is the lack of a molecular marker specific to them that is visible during early differentiation of the testis.

Current knowledge suggests that PTMs arise from cells within the developing gonad itself, or alternatively from a layer of cells surrounding the outside of the gonad, called coelomic epithelium, by a process named epithelial-mesenchymal transition.

PTMs acquire androgen receptors during their development, enabling them to respond to androgens which help them to maintain seminiferous tubule function.

== History ==
PTMs were first observed in 1901, when Claudius Regaud made a detailed study of the histology and physiology of the seminiferous tubules in rats. He described the PTMs as a single layer of flattened cells, which enclose the seminiferous tubules, and called them ‘’modified connective tissue cells’’.

In 1958, Yves Clermont made a further investigation of the cells by electron microscopy. He found that these cells have a cytological resemblance to smooth muscle cells – they contain actin filaments, have invaginations at the cell surface and their organelles are located in the centre of the cell. He also suggested that these cells are responsible for the tubular contraction and referred to them as ‘’interlamellar cells’’.

Subsequently, in 1967, Michael Ross studied the fine structure of these cells in mice and proved that the smooth muscle-like cells are contractile. He called them ‘’peritubular contractile cells’’. In 1969, Don Wayne Fawcett et al. termed these cells ‘’peritubular myoid cells’’, because of their similarities to smooth muscle cells.

== Etymology ==
As PTMs became better characterized, the associated nomenclature underwent a series of changes.

In very early literature these cells may be referred to as ‘modified connective tissue cells’ or ‘interlamellar cells’. Subsequent experiments resulted in renaming these cells to better reflect their contractile nature. The term ‘peritubular contractile cells’ was first used in 1967.

In 1969, Don Fawcett labelled these cells as ‘peritubular myoid cells’. ‘Peritubular’ refers to their anatomical location: adjacent to the seminiferous tubule. ‘Myoid’ stems from the Greek ‘myo’ (/ˈmʌɪəʊ/), which means relating to muscle. (PTMs resemble smooth muscle cells under an electron microscope).
