= SPATA16 =

Reproductive gene and associated protein

Identifiers
- Aliases: SPATA16, NYD-SP12, SPGF6, spermatogenesis associated 16
- External IDs: OMIM: 609856; MGI: 1918112; GeneCards: SPATA16

Gene location (Human)
Chr.	Chromosome 3 (human)
Band	3q26.31	Start	172,889,357 bp
Band	3q26.31	End	173,141,235 bp

Gene location (Mouse)
Chr.	Chromosome 3 (mouse)
Band	3|3 A3	Start	26,691,769 bp
Band	3|3 A3	End	27,037,361 bp
RNA expression pattern
Bgee	Human / Mouse (ortholog); Top expressed in: sperm; left testis; right testis; testicle; oocyte; secondary oocyte; buccal mucosa cell; metanephros; gonad; human kidney / Top expressed in: spermatid; spermatocyte; seminiferous tubule; islet of Langerhans; More reference expression data
BioGPS	n/a
Gene ontology
Molecular function	molecular function
Cellular component	Golgi apparatus
Biological process	cell differentiation; multicellular organism development; spermatogenesis; biological process
Sources:Amigo / QuickGO
Orthologs
Databases	NCBI: entry; OMA: entry
Species	Human	Mouse
Entrez	83893	70862
Ensembl	ENSG00000144962	ENSMUSG00000039335
UniProt	Q9BXB7	Q8C636
RefSeq (mRNA)	NM_031955	NM_027583; NM_029150
RefSeq (protein)	NP_114161	NP_081859; NP_083426
Location (UCSC)	Chr 3: 172.89 – 173.14 Mb	Chr 3: 26.69 – 27.04 Mb
PubMed search
- Wikidata
View/Edit Human	View/Edit Mouse

Spermatogenesis-associated protein 16 is a mammalian protein encoded by the SPATA16 gene. SPATA16, also known as NYD-SP12, is a developmental protein that aids in differentiation of germ cells for spermatogenesis and participates in acrosome formation for appropriate sperm-egg fusion. SPATA16 is located on chromosome 3 at position 26.31 (reverse strand) and is a member of the tetratricopeptide repeat-like superfamily, which facilitate interactions and assemblies between proteins and protein complexes.

== Identification ==
SPATA16 (NYD-SP12) was first identified by a research lab in 2002, led by Dr. Jiahao Sha, at Nanjing Medical University in Nanjing, China. The research team used cDNA microarrays to compare expression levels of genes between adult and fetal human testes. It was discovered that the expression levels of SPATA16 were higher in adult testes than fetal testes, which signified that the gene is required for complete spermatogenesis once a male reaches puberty. Expression of SPATA16 is the highest in testicular tissue; however, SPATA16 is also expressed in several other tissue types including skeletal muscle, nervous tissue, and integumentary system tissue. SPATA16 accumulates around the Golgi apparatus that is perinuclear in the cytoplasm of Sertoli cells; however, the gene is not present in the interstitial cells of Leydig in the testes. Mutations in the SPATA16 gene are associated with male infertility in humans and can cause globozoospermia, which are round-headed sperm without acrosomes. Sperm with incorrect head morphology and absent acrosome are unable to bind to an oocyte for fertilization. Studies involving knockout SPATA16 male mice indicate a slight functional difference of the SPATA16 gene between mice and humans. SPATA16 knockout mice are completely infertile, and it is characterized by spermatogenesis arrest and azoospermia. This is where the differentiation process is obstructed during spermatogenesis and creates immotile sperm. In contrast, infertility caused by SPATA16 mutations in male humans develop spermatozoa that are motile, but their sperm exhibit head and acrosome abnormalities.
