= Spermatidogenesis =

Spermatid creation during spermatogenesis

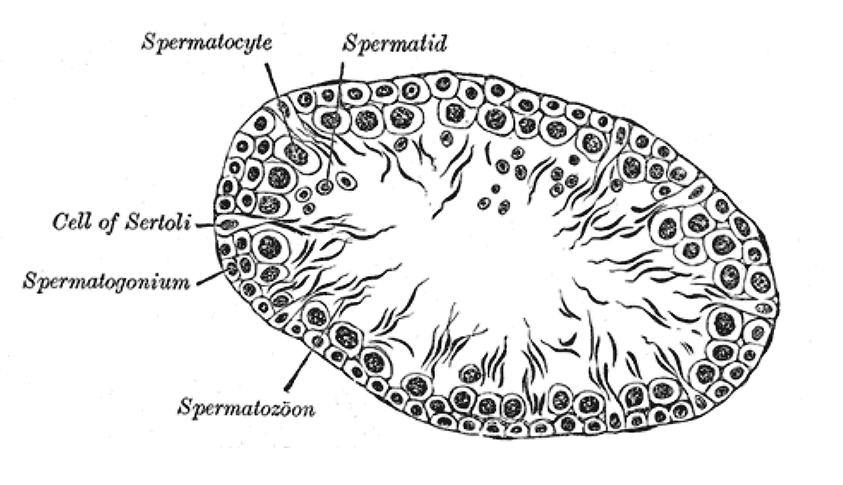
Cross section of the epithelium of a seminiferous tubule showing various stages of spermatocyte development

Scheme showing analogies in the process of maturation of the ovum and the development of the spermatids (young spermatozoa).

Spermatidogenesis is the creation of spermatids from secondary spermatocytes during spermatogenesis.

Secondary spermatocytes produced earlier rapidly enter meiosis II and divide to produce haploid spermatids.

The brevity of this stage means that secondary spermatocytes are rarely seen in histological preparations. Mouse stem cells were grown into cells resembling spermatids in 2016. These spermatids, when injected into mouse eggs, were able to produce pups.
