= Spermatogonial stem cell =

Spermatogonium that does not differentiate into a spermatocyte

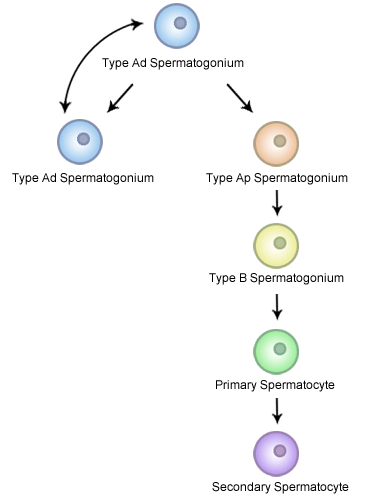
The fates of spermatogonial stem cells: renewal or differentiation

A spermatogonial stem cell (SSC), also known as a type A spermatogonium, is a spermatogonium that does not differentiate into a spermatocyte, a precursor of sperm cells. Instead, they continue dividing into other spermatogonia or remain dormant to maintain a reserve of spermatogonia. Type B spermatogonia, on the other hand, differentiate into spermatocytes, which in turn undergo meiosis to eventually form mature sperm cells.

== In the testis ==
During fetal development, gonocytes develop from primordial germ cells, and following this SSCs develop from gonocytes in the testis. SSCs are the early precursor for spermatozoa and are responsible for the continuation of spermatogenesis in adult mammals. The stem cells are capable of dividing into more SSCs which is vital for maintaining the stem cell pool. Alternatively, they go on to differentiate into spermatocytes, spermatids, and finally spermatozoa.

One SSC is the precursor for multiple spermatozoa and therefore SSCs are much less numerous in the testes than cells undergoing spermatogenesis.

=== Nomenclature ===
==== In humans ====
Undifferentiated spermatogonia can be split into 2 groups; A Dark (A_{d}) and A Pale (A_{p})

A_{d} spermatogonia are reserve stem cells. These cells can divide to produce more SSCs but usually do not. A_{p} spermatogonia are actively dividing to maintain the stem cell pool. B1-B4 spermatogonia encompass the differentiating spermatogonia and are no longer considered to be stem cells.

Most research into SSCs has been carried out in rodents. The subtypes of spermatogonia differ between mice and humans.

==== In mice ====
A Single (A_{s}) spermatogonia is capable of creating 2 separate daughter SSCs when they divide or the daughter cells can join and form A Paired (A_{pr}) spermatogonia.

Both A_{s} and A_{pr} spermatogonia are undifferentiated. Chains of these cells form and are referred to as A Aligned (A_{al}). A_{al} spermatogonia differentiate and thus are no longer classed as stem cells. They go on to divide 6 times eventually forming B-type spermatogonia.

=== SSC Niche ===
The most important somatic cells that support the regulation of SSCs are Sertoli cells. Various other somatic cells in the interstitial tissue support Sertoli cells such as Leydig cells and peritubular myoid cells therefore indirectly influencing SSCs and the location of their niche.

Spermatogonia stem cells in mammals are found between the basal membrane of the seminiferous tubules and the Sertoli cells. They remain here until the meiotic prophase stage of meiosis. Here the spermatocytes pass through the basal membrane via the sertoli cell barrier.

SSCs stay within their niche where they are encouraged to self-renew. When they move past the basal membrane they differentiate due to cell signals.

== Paracrine regulation of SSC self-renewal ==
Local signals regulate the self-renewal of spermatogonial stem cells (SSCs). Around 50% of the SSC population undergo self-renewal to maintain stem cell numbers, and the other 50% become committed progenitor cells that will differentiate into spermatozoa during spermatogenesis. Cells present in the testes express molecules that play key roles in the regulation of SSC self-renewal. In mice, Sertoli cells have been shown to secrete Glial cell line-derived neurotrophic factor (GDNF) which has a stimulatory effect on stem cell self-renewal. This factor is thought to be expressed in the peritubular cells in human testes. Fibroblast growth factor (FGF2) is another molecule crucial for the regulation of stem cell renewal and is expressed in Sertoli cells, Leydig cells, and germ cells. FGF2 signaling interacts with GDNF to enhance the proliferation rate. Chemokine (C-X-C motif) ligand 12 (CXCL12) signaling via its receptor C-X-C chemokine receptor type 4 (CXCR4) is also involved in the regulation of SSC fate decisions.CXCL12 is found in Sertoli cells in the basement membrane of the seminiferous tubules in adult mouse testes, and its receptor is expressed in undifferentiated spermatogonial cells.

GDNF and FGF2 are both required to activate the phosphoinositide 3-kinase (PI3K)-Akt pathway, and the mitogen-activated protein kinase/ERK1 kinase1 (MEK) pathway, which potentiates SSC proliferation and survival. CXCL12, FGF2, and GDNF all communicate via a network to mediate SSC functions.

== Differentiation ==
Spermatogonial stem cells are the precursors to spermatozoa, which are produced through a series of differentiation steps. This is the alternative SSC outcome to self-renewal. SSCs survive within microenvironments, termed niches, which provide extrinsic stimuli that drive stem cell differentiation or self-renewal. The SSC niche is found in the seminiferous epithelium of mammalian testis and is primarily constituted of Sertoli and peritubular myoid cells.

There are two primary differentiation stages, the first of which involves transforming A_{s} (single) spermatogonia into daughter progeny A_{pr} (paired) spermatogonia, which are predestined to differentiate. These can divide further to create A_{al} (A-aligned) spermatogonia.

The second step involves the production of differentiating A1 spermatogonia from A_{pr} or A_{al} spermatogonia. These A1 spermatogonia undergo a further five divisions to produce A2, A3, A4, intermediate, and type B spermatogonia, which can enter meiosis I.

It takes around 64 days to produce mature spermatozoa from differentiating SSCs, and 100 million spermatozoa can be produced each day.

One of the major known substances driving the differentiation of SSCs, and therefore the production of spermatozoa, is Retinoic Acid (RA). There are theories supporting the hypotheses of both an indirect (via Sertoli cells) or a direct pathway.

It is thought that Sertoli cells produce RA through the conversion of circulating retinol to retinal and then finally to RA. Exposure to RA drives cellular differentiation into A1 spermatogonia and is implicated in further meiotic differentiation. As a result of differentiation, the genes required to maintain an SSC state are no longer expressed.

Male reproductive function declines with increasing age as indicated by decreased sperm quality and fertility. As rats age, undifferentiated spermatogonial cells undergo numerous changes in gene expression. These changes include upregulation of several genes involved in the DNA damage response. This finding suggests that during aging there is an increase in DNA damage leading to an upregulation of DNA damage response proteins to help repair these damages. Thus it appears that reproductive aging originates in undifferentiated spermatogenic cells.

== Isolation and culture ==
SSCs have the potential to become increasingly clinically relevant in treating sterility (in vitro spermatogenesis) and preserving fertility before gonadotoxic treatments. To this aim, SSCs must be reliably isolated from testicular biopsies e.g. expansion and purification. Current protocols include magnetic-activated cell sorting (MACS) and fluorescence-activated cell sorting (FACS) based on positive SSC cellular markers such as CD90 and FGFR3 in combination with negative markers like CD45. The latter is particularly important in excluding malignant cells from cancer patients' biopsies.

Once isolated, SSC populations are cultured for amplification, characterization, line maintenance, and potentially in vitro spermatogenesis or genomic editing. The main challenges to SSC culturing are the interactions between media substances and the epigenetic makeup that underlies pluripotency and can affect future offspring. Short-term in vitro propagation of these cells has been carried out in Stem-Pro 34 media supplemented by growth factors. The long-term culture of human SSCs is not established yet, however, one group reports successful proliferation in feeder cell-free media supplied with growth factors and hydrogel.

== Transplantation ==
The first successful SSC transplantation was described in mice in 1994 whereby the procedure restored spermatogenesis fully in an otherwise infertile mouse. These mice were then able to produce viable offspring which opened new exciting doors for future potential therapies in humans.

As cancer treatments are not cancer cell-specific and are often gonadotoxic (toxic to the ovaries and the testes), children usually face infertility as a consequence of treatment as there is no established way to preserve their fertility yet, especially in prepubertal boys. Infertility after cancer treatment depends on the type and dosage of treatment but can vary from 17% to 82% of patients. Spermatogonial stem cell therapy (SSCT) has been proposed as a potential method to restore fertility in cancer survivors who desire to have children later in life. The method has been tested in numerous animal models including non-human primates; Hermann et al. took out and isolated SSCs from prepubertal and adult rhesus macaques before treating them with busulfan (an alkylating agent used in chemotherapy). SSCs were then injected back into the rete testis of the same animal that they were taken from ~10–12 weeks after treatment, and spermatogenesis was observed in almost all recipients (16/17). However, these SSCs were difficult to detect which is why further analysis of the ability of descendant sperm to fertilize could not be determined. The viability of embryos fertilized by donor sperm after SSC transplantation needs to be evaluated to truly determine the usefulness of this technique.

Recently, SSC transplantation has also been proposed as a potential method for the conservation of endangered species through xenogeneic transplantation. Roe et al. suggested that the reproductive lifespan of such species could be extended by transplanting their germ cells into a domestic host. In their study, they used the quail as a model for an exotic species and transplanted SSCs into chicken embryos which successfully colonized the gonadal ridge of the host embryo. This allows the isolation of mature sperm later on in development from the host even after the donor has deceased which can be used in future fertilization and potentially more successful conservation.
