= Acroplaxome =

Structure found between the acrosomal membrane and the nuclear membrane

Spermatozoa develop in the seminiferous tubules of the testes. During their development, the spermatogonia proceed through meiosis to become spermatozoa. Many changes occur during this process: the DNA in nuclei becomes condensed; the acrosome develops as a structure close to the nucleus. The acrosome is derived from the Golgi apparatus and contains hydrolytic enzymes important for fusion of the spermatozoon with an egg cell. During spermiogenesis, the nucleus condenses and changes shape. Abnormal shape change is a feature of sperm in male infertility. The acroplaxome is a structure found between the acrosomal membrane and the nuclear membrane. The acroplaxome contains structural proteins including keratin 5, F-actin and profilin IV.
