= ETS variant 5 =

Protein-coding gene in the species Homo sapiens

ETV5

Identifiers
- Aliases: ETV5, ERM, ETS variant 5, ETS variant transcription factor 5
- External IDs: OMIM: 601600; MGI: 1096867; GeneCards: ETV5
Available structures
PDB	Ortholog search: PDBe RCSB
PDB	List of PDB id codes 4UNO

Gene location (Human)
Chr.	Chromosome 3 (human)
Band	3q27.2	Start	186,046,314 bp
Band	3q27.2	End	186,110,318 bp

Gene location (Mouse)
Chr.	Chromosome 16 (mouse)
Band	16|16 B1	Start	22,200,059 bp
Band	16|16 B1	End	22,258,469 bp
RNA expression pattern
Bgee	Human / Mouse (ortholog); Top expressed in: buccal mucosa cell; ventricular zone; secondary oocyte; ganglionic eminence; caput epididymis; Brodmann area 46; prefrontal cortex; placenta; pituitary gland; gonad / Top expressed in: tail of embryo; epiblast; lung; palate; soft palate; yolk sac; Cortex of frontal lobe; embryo; primary visual cortex; superior frontal gyrus; More reference expression data
BioGPS	n/a
Gene ontology
Molecular function	DNA binding; sequence-specific DNA binding; RNA polymerase II transcription regulatory region sequence-specific DNA binding; DNA-binding transcription factor activity; DNA-binding transcription activator activity, RNA polymerase II-specific; protein binding; DNA-binding transcription factor activity, RNA polymerase II-specific
Cellular component	nucleoplasm; nucleus; plasma membrane
Biological process	cell differentiation; regulation of transcription, DNA-templated; locomotory behavior; regulation of branching involved in mammary gland duct morphogenesis; positive regulation of transcription, DNA-templated; neuromuscular synaptic transmission; male germ-line stem cell asymmetric division; positive regulation of neuron differentiation; skeletal muscle acetylcholine-gated channel clustering; cellular response to oxidative stress; positive regulation of glial cell proliferation; regulation of synapse organization; positive regulation of transcription by RNA polymerase II; transcription by RNA polymerase II; regulation of transcription by RNA polymerase II
Sources:Amigo / QuickGO
Orthologs
Databases	NCBI: entry; OMA: entry
Species	Human	Mouse
Entrez	2119	104156
Ensembl	ENSG00000244405	ENSMUSG00000013089
UniProt	P41161	Q9CXC9
RefSeq (mRNA)	NM_004454	NM_023794; NM_001358428
RefSeq (protein)	NP_004445	NP_076283; NP_001345357
Location (UCSC)	Chr 3: 186.05 – 186.11 Mb	Chr 16: 22.2 – 22.26 Mb
PubMed search
- Wikidata
View/Edit Human	View/Edit Mouse

ets variant gene 5 (ets-related molecule)

Identifiers
- Symbol: ETV5
- Alt. symbols: ERM
- NCBI gene: 2119
- HGNC: 3494
- OMIM: 601600
- RefSeq: NM_004454
- UniProt: P41161

Other data
- Locus: Chr. 3 q28
Search for
- Structures: Swiss-model
- Domains: InterPro

Ets variant 5 (ETV5) (also named ERM transcription factor) is a transcription factor that in humans is encoded by the ETV5 gene. It is generated in Sertoli cells, which are found in the testes and play a crucial role in spermatogenesis. Its ortholog has been linked to both obesity and bipolar disorder.
