= SPACA3 =

Protein-coding gene in the species Homo sapiens

Identifiers
- Aliases: SPACA3, 1700025M08Rik, ALLP17, CT54, LYC3, LYZL3, SLLP1, LYZC, sperm acrosome associated 3
- External IDs: OMIM: 612749; MGI: 1922872; GeneCards: SPACA3
Available structures
PDB	Ortholog search: PDBe RCSB
PDB	List of PDB id codes 4YF2

Gene location (Human)
Chr.	Chromosome 17 (human)
Band	17q11.2	Start	32,970,376 bp
Band	17q11.2	End	32,997,877 bp

Gene location (Mouse)
Chr.	Chromosome 11 (mouse)
Band	11|11 B5	Start	80,749,191 bp
Band	11|11 B5	End	80,758,640 bp
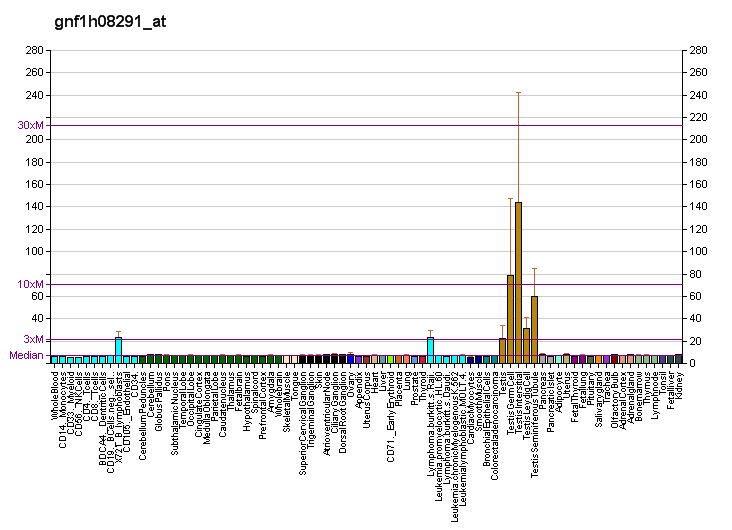
RNA expression pattern
Bgee	Human / Mouse (ortholog); Top expressed in: left testis; right testis; sperm; testicle; body of pancreas; gonad; mucosa of transverse colon; right coronary artery; tibial nerve; granulocyte / Top expressed in: spermatid; seminiferous tubule; spermatocyte; lacrimal gland; morula; pancreas; cochlea; islet of Langerhans; foregut; stomach; More reference expression data
BioGPS	More reference expression data
Gene ontology
Molecular function	protein binding; lysozyme activity
Cellular component	integral component of membrane; extracellular region; acrosomal vesicle; secretory granule; membrane; cytoplasmic vesicle; extracellular space; acrosomal membrane; acrosomal matrix
Biological process	monocyte activation; cell wall macromolecule catabolic process; fertilization; positive regulation of phagocytosis; response to virus; positive regulation of macrophage activation; sperm-egg recognition; defense response to Gram-positive bacterium; peptidoglycan catabolic process; defense response to Gram-negative bacterium; fusion of sperm to egg plasma membrane involved in single fertilization
Sources:Amigo / QuickGO
Orthologs
Databases	NCBI: entry; OMA: entry
Species	Human	Mouse
Entrez	124912	75622
Ensembl	ENSG00000141316	ENSMUSG00000053184
UniProt	Q8IXA5	Q9D9X8
RefSeq (mRNA)	NM_173847; NM_001317225; NM_001317226	NM_029367; NM_001359183
RefSeq (protein)	NP_001304154; NP_001304155; NP_776246	NP_083643; NP_001346112
Location (UCSC)	Chr 17: 32.97 – 33 Mb	Chr 11: 80.75 – 80.76 Mb
PubMed search
- Wikidata
View/Edit Human	View/Edit Mouse

Sperm acrosome membrane-associated protein 3 is a protein that in humans is encoded by the SPACA3 gene. It may be involved in adhesion to the egg before the egg is fertilized.

== See also ==
- Acrosome
