= Spermatocytogenesis =

Division of stem cells leading to sperm

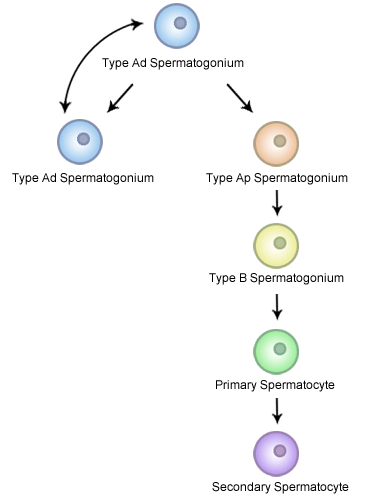
Schematic diagram of Spermatocytogenesis

Spermatocytogenesis is the male form of gametocytogenesis and involves stem cells dividing to replace themselves and to produce a population of cells destined to become mature sperm.

The stem cells involved are called spermatogonia and are a specific type of stem cell known as gametogonia.

Three functionally separate spermatogonia cell types are recognized on the basis of the appearance of the nuclei: type A dark spermatogonia (Ad), type A pale spermatogonia (Ap), and type B spermatogonia (B).

== Type Ad spermatogonia ("dark") ==
The population of spermatogonia is maintained by type Ad spermatogonia. These cells do not directly participate in producing sperm, instead serving to maintain the supply of stem cells for spermatogenesis.

Each type Ad spermatogonium divides to produce another type Ad spermatogonium, which can further carry on spermatogenesis, and one type Ap spermatogonium, which differentiates further.

== Type Ap spermatogonia ("pale") ==
Type Ap spermatogonia repeatedly divide mitotically to produce identical cell clones linked by cytoplasmic bridges (in rodents, not in primates such as humans).

The connections between cells allow development to be synchronized. When repeated division ceases, the cells differentiate into type B spermatogonia. This stage is referred to as the spermatogonia phase.

== Type B spermatogonia ==
Type B spermatogonia undergo mitosis to produce diploid intermediate cells called primary spermatocytes.

== See also ==
- Oogenesis
- Spermatogenesis
