= H1FNT =

Protein-encoding gene

H1-7

Identifiers
- Aliases: H1-7, H1T2, H1.7, H1 histone family member N, testis specific, H1FNT, H1.7 linker histone
- External IDs: GeneCards: H1-7

Gene location (Human)
Chr.	Chromosome 12 (human)
Band	12q13.11	Start	48,328,980 bp
Band	12q13.11	End	48,330,279 bp
RNA expression pattern
Bgee	Human / Mouse (ortholog); Top expressed in: left testis; right testis; sperm; testicle; gonad; sural nerve; granulocyte; gastric mucosa; right ovary; gastrocnemius muscle / n/a; More reference expression data
BioGPS	n/a
Gene ontology
Molecular function	DNA binding; nucleotide binding; ATP binding; double-stranded DNA binding; protein binding; nucleosomal DNA binding
Cellular component	nucleus; chromosome
Biological process	multicellular organism development; cell differentiation; chromosome condensation; spermatogenesis; spermatid nucleus elongation; sperm DNA condensation; regulation of transcription, DNA-templated; negative regulation of DNA recombination
Sources:Amigo / QuickGO
Orthologs
Databases	NCBI: entry; OMA: entry
Species	Human	Mouse
Entrez	341567	n/a
Ensembl	ENSG00000187166	n/a
UniProt	Q75WM6	n/a
RefSeq (mRNA)	NM_181788	n/a
RefSeq (protein)	NP_861453	n/a
Location (UCSC)	Chr 12: 48.33 – 48.33 Mb	n/a
PubMed search		n/a
- Wikidata
View/Edit Human

H1 histone family, member N, testis-specific is a member of the histone family of nuclear proteins which are a component of chromatin. In humans, this protein is encoded by the H1FNT gene.

The H1FNT protein is essential for nuclear formation in spermatozoa, and is involved in the replacement of histones with protamines during spermiogenesis.
