= Sertoli cell nodule =

- Other names: Pick's adenoma, testicular tubular adenoma, tubular adenoma of the testis
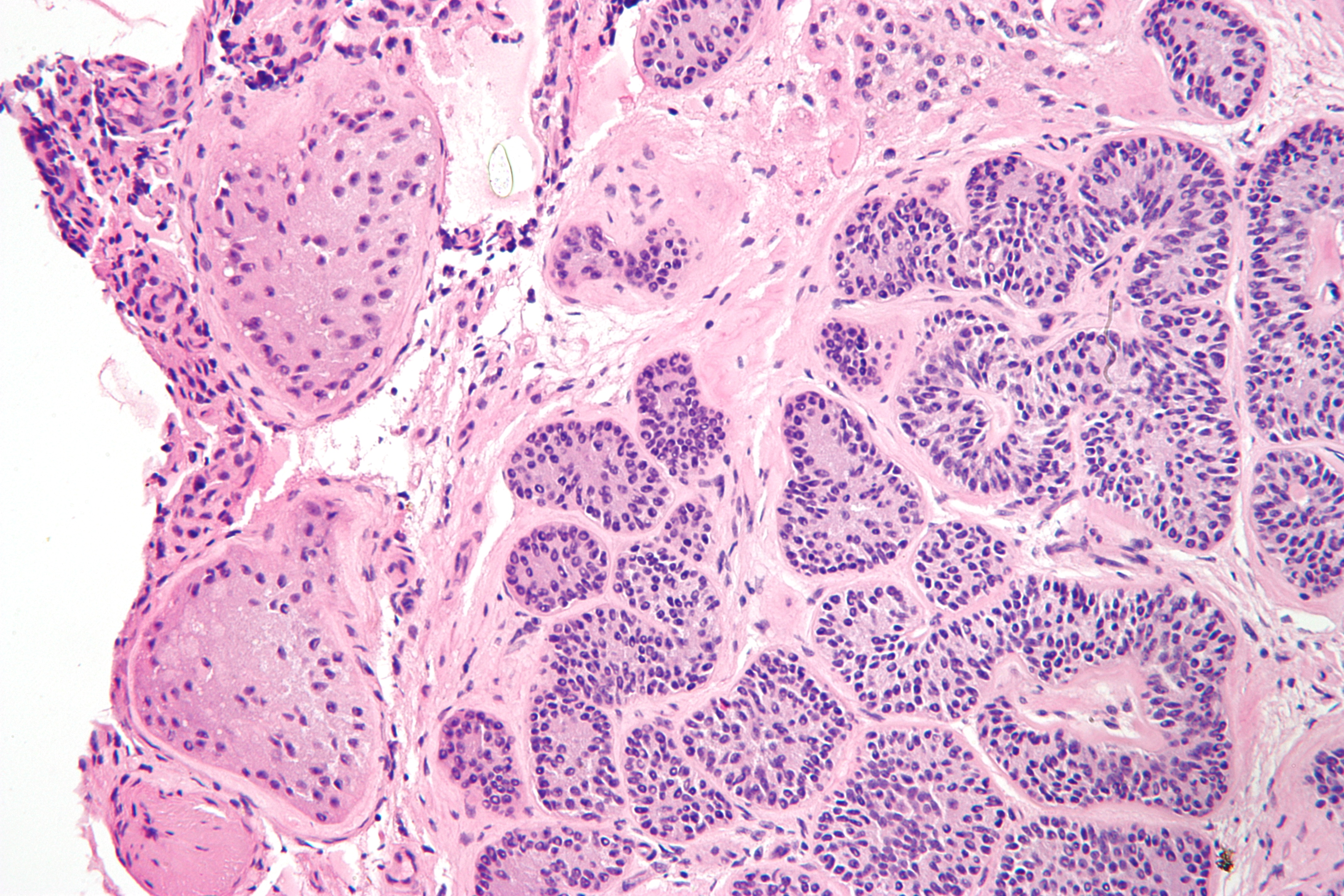
- Micrograph of a Sertoli cell nodule. H&E stain.
- Specialty: Urology

A Sertoli cell nodule is a benign proliferation of Sertoli cells that arises in association with cryptorchidism (undescended testis). They are not composed of a clonal cell population, i.e. neoplastic; thus, technically, they should not be called an adenoma.

== Pathology ==
Sertoli cell nodules are unencapsulated nodules that consist of:

1. cells arranged in well-formed tubules (that vaguely resemble immature Sertoli cells), with
2. bland hyperchromatic oval/round nuclei that are stratified, and
3. may contain eosinophilic (hyaline) blob in lumen (centre).
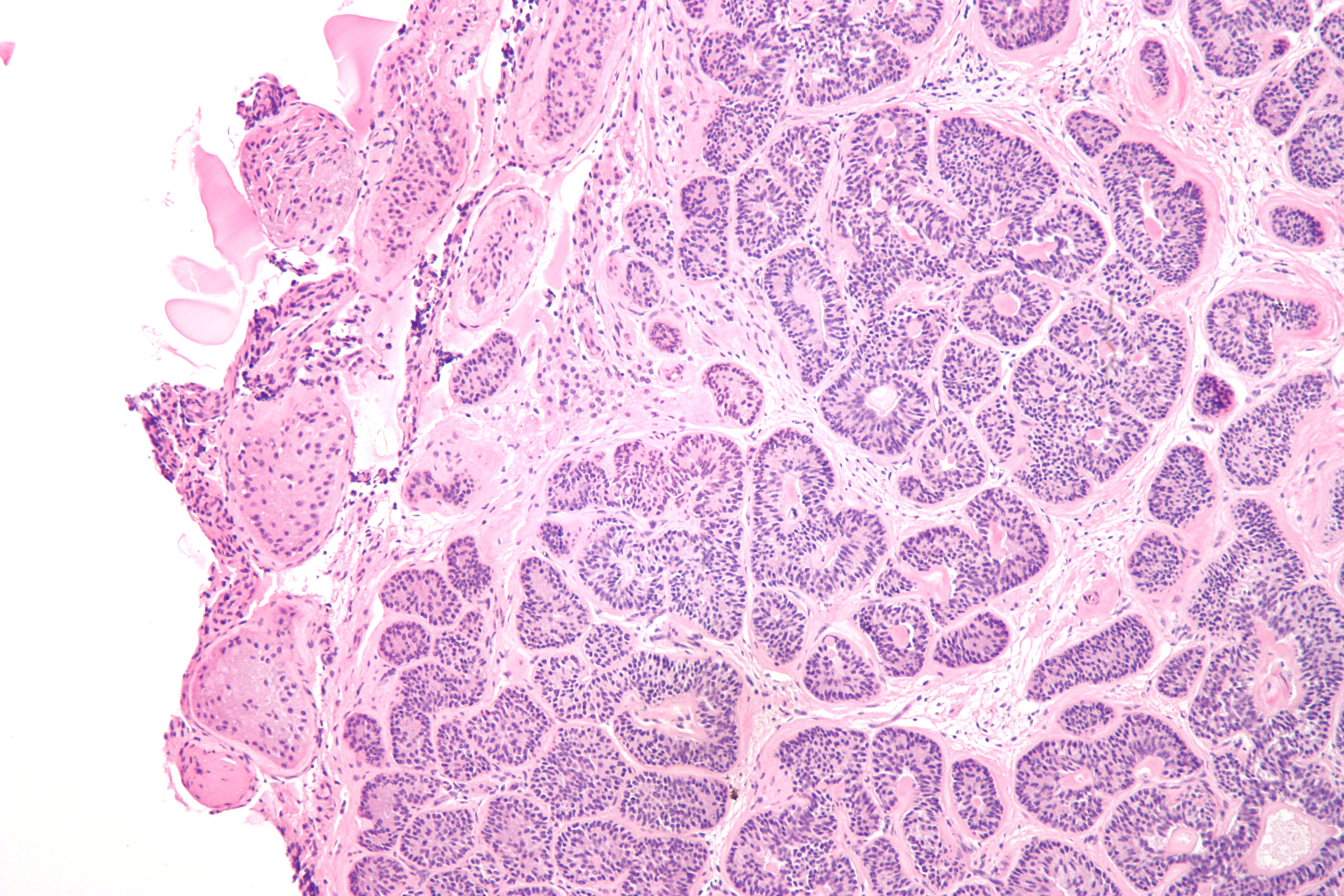
Micrograph of a Sertoli cell nodule. H&E stain.

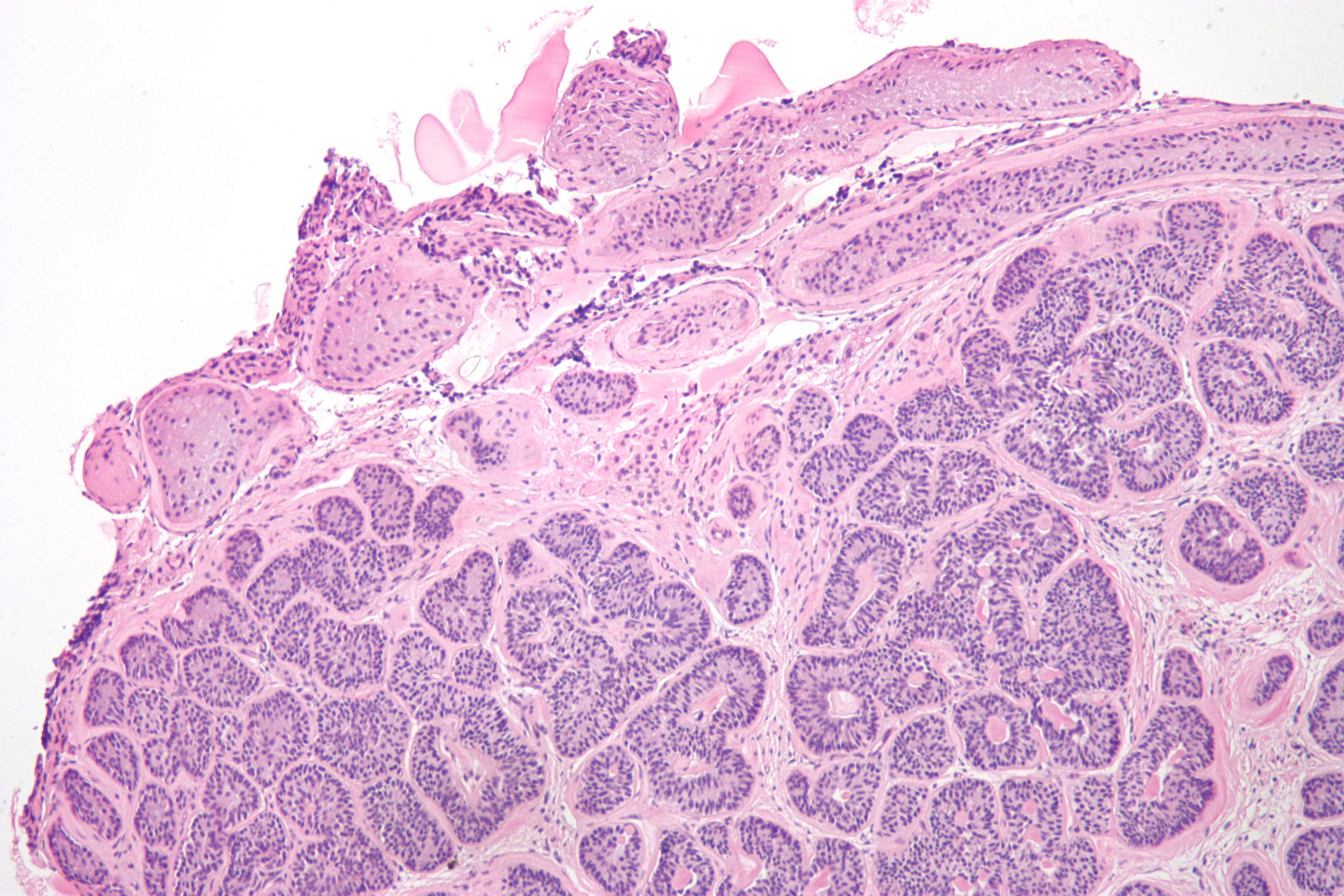
Micrograph of a Sertoli cell nodule. H&E stain.
