= Globozoospermia =

- Other names: Round-headed sperm syndrome
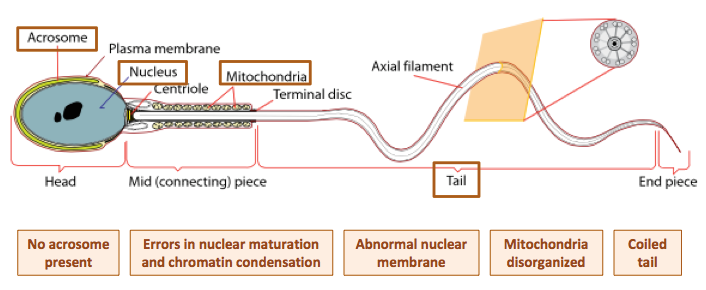
- Figure 1: Diagram representing the morphology of normal sperm. Areas surrounded by an orange box represent areas changed in the sperm of an individual with globozoospermia. Orange boxes highlight the specifics of the changed areas in globozoospermia.

Globozoospermia is a rare and severe form of monomorphic teratozoospermia. This means that the spermatozoa show the same abnormality, and over 85% of spermatozoa in sperm have this abnormality. Globozoospermia is responsible for less than 0.1% of male infertility. It is characterised by round-headed spermatozoa without acrosomes, an abnormal nuclear membrane and midpiece defects. Affected males therefore suffer from either reduced fertility or infertility. Studies suggest that globozoospermia can be either total (100% round-headed spermatozoa without acrosomes) or partial (20-60% round acrosomeless spermatozoa with normal sperm also identified in the sperm count), however it is unclear whether these two forms are variations on the same syndrome, or actually different syndromes.

Infertility in this condition results from the sperm heads missing their acrosome. These sperm, therefore, have a characteristic round or spherically shaped head. Given the absence of the acrosome, these sperm are unable to penetrate the oocyte and are unable to achieve fertilization through conventional means; however, these sperm are able to fertilize the egg through in vitro fertilization with intracytoplasmic sperm injection, which is the treatment of choice for these patients.

Studies have suggested mutations or deletions in three genes are responsible for this condition: SPATA16, PICK1 and DPY19L2. ICSI (intracytoplasmic sperm injection) has previously been used to assist reproduction in globozoospermic patients, however it has not been particularly effective in all patients, due to low fertilisation rates.

== Types of globozoospermia ==
There are two types of globozoospermia:

- Type 1 globozoospermia exhibits a complete lack of acrosome and acrosomal enzymes and spherical arrangement of the chromatin. This makes the sperm completely unable to penetrate the zona pellucida.
- The sperm in Type 2 globozoospermia has some acrosomal covering surrounded by large droplets of cytoplasmic material, suggesting secondary degenerative changes. There is also a conical nucleus. It is thought that infertility in this type of globozoospermia is due to incorrect chromatin packaging which prevents proper fertilization.

== Symptoms ==
Aside from the effect on fertility globozoospermia is symptomless. People with globozoospermia have normal physical and mental development, normal clinical features and normal hormonal profile.

== Genetics ==
Genes mutated in globozoospermia	Gene product and its normal function	Mutation's effect on sperm in globozoospermia
DPY19L2 – most frequent mutation in globozoospermia	Transmembrane protein localised on the acrosome of spermatids. It contributes to normal acrosome formation by anchoring the acrosome to the spermatozoa nucleus.	Sperm head elongation and acrosome formation fails causing a round-headed sperm to form so sperm are unable to bind the zona pellucida and fertilise the oocyte. Sperm concentration in the semen also reduces.
PICK1	Cytosolic protein found in the proacrosomal vesicles of round spermatids. It functions during protein trafficking.	Proacrosomal vesicles fail to merge causing a round-headed sperm to form so sperm are unable to bind the zona pellucida and fertilise the oocyte.
SPATA16	A protein:protein interaction domain located in proacrosomal vesicles and golgi apparatus. It plays a role in spermatogenesis and acrosome formation.	Acrosome is absent creating round-headed sperm unable to bind the zona pellucida and fertilise the oocyte. The gene was first identified in a family with three out of six brothers being homozygous for the mutation; their sperm was acrosomeless and showed round headedness.

Table 1: Gene mutations that have been identified in globozoospermia and the impact these mutations have on sperm function and successful fertilization.

== Diagnosis ==
The presence of round headed sperm in a semen analysis sample confirms the diagnosis of globozoospermia. The lack of acrosome can be ascertained by either morphology staining or immunofluorescence.

== Treatment ==
Until 1995, the only options for people with globozoospermia who wished to conceive were adoption or sperm donation. With the advancement of assisted reproductive techniques (ART) it is now possible for those with globozoospermia to conceive using their own sperm. The main technique used is intracytoplasmic sperm injection (ICSI) where fertilisation is achieved by a single sperm being injected into the egg. Some studies have shown it is possible for a viable embryo to be created with this technique alone, however others have found it necessary to also use calcium ionophore treatment for fertilisation to be successful. Calcium ionophore treatment is used to artificially activate the oocyte. This treatment may be necessary as globozoospermic sperm can be less likely to activate the oocyte, an important stage in fertilisation.

The treatment options currently available focus on overcoming the prognosis of infertility which is associated with globozoospermia. So far there are no treatment options to prevent or cure globozoospermia.

== Research ==
Research into globozoospermia is aimed at improving understanding of its cause and developing treatment options.

=== Genetics ===
The observation has been made many times that globozoospermia arises in siblings which points towards an underlying genetic cause. Recent progress has been made into determining what genes could be implicated in this pathology, with the previously mentioned genes being found to play a role. There are more genes which have been shown to be mutated in globozoospermia in mice, but these are yet to be connected to the human disease process. Examples of these include Gopc, Hrb and Csnka2. There are thousands of genes which guide the process of spermatogenesis, and knowing how they're involved in globozoospermia is an important current area of research.

=== ICSI ===
The development of intracytoplasmic sperm injection made conception a possibility for patients with a variety of male infertility conditions, including globozoospermia. However, fertility rates with this approach are still low, and research is ongoing into how this can be improved.

It has been found that treating globozoospermia with ICSI along with oocyte activation by calcium ionophore (an ion carrier used to increase intracellular calcium is more likely to result in conception than ICSI alone. Another promising treatment area also looks at causing oocyte activation in conjunction with ICSI, this time using spermatic binding-proteins, phospholipase C zeta (PLCζ) and postacrosomal sheath WW domain binding protein (PAWP).
