= Spermatocyte =

Sperm precursor cell that undergoes meiosis

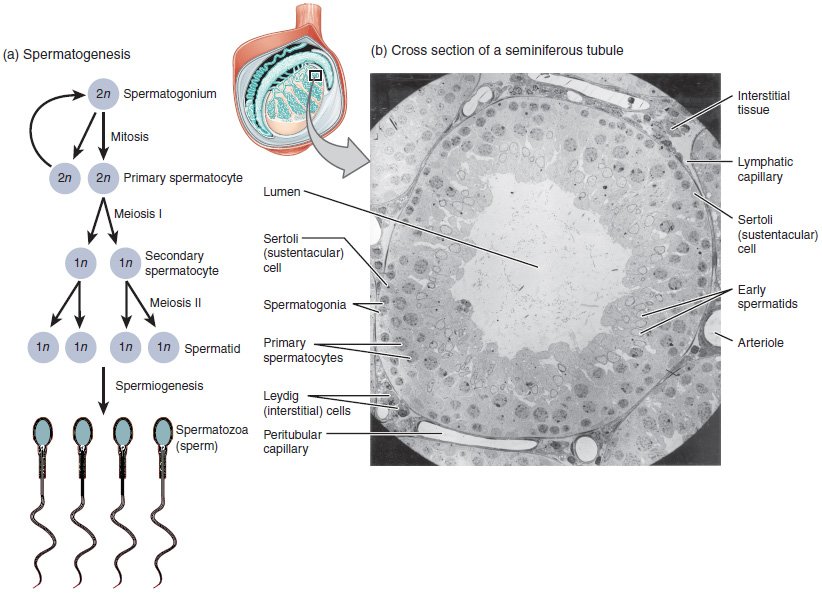
Spermatogenesis as the cells progress from spermatogium, to primary spermatocytes, to secondary spermatocytes, to spermatids and to sperm.

Spermatocytes are a type of male gametocyte in animals. They derive from immature germ cells called spermatogonia. They are found in the testis, in a structure known as the seminiferous tubules. There are two types of spermatocytes, primary and secondary spermatocytes. Primary and secondary spermatocytes are formed through the process of spermatocytogenesis.

Primary spermatocytes are diploid (2N) cells. After meiosis I, two secondary spermatocytes are formed. Secondary spermatocytes are haploid (N) cells that contain half the number of chromosomes.

In all animals, males produce spermatocytes, even hermaphrodites such as C. elegans, which exist as a male or hermaphrodite. In hermaphrodite C. elegans, sperm production occurs first and is then stored in the spermatheca. Once the eggs are formed, they are able to self-fertilize and produce up to 350 progeny.

== Development ==
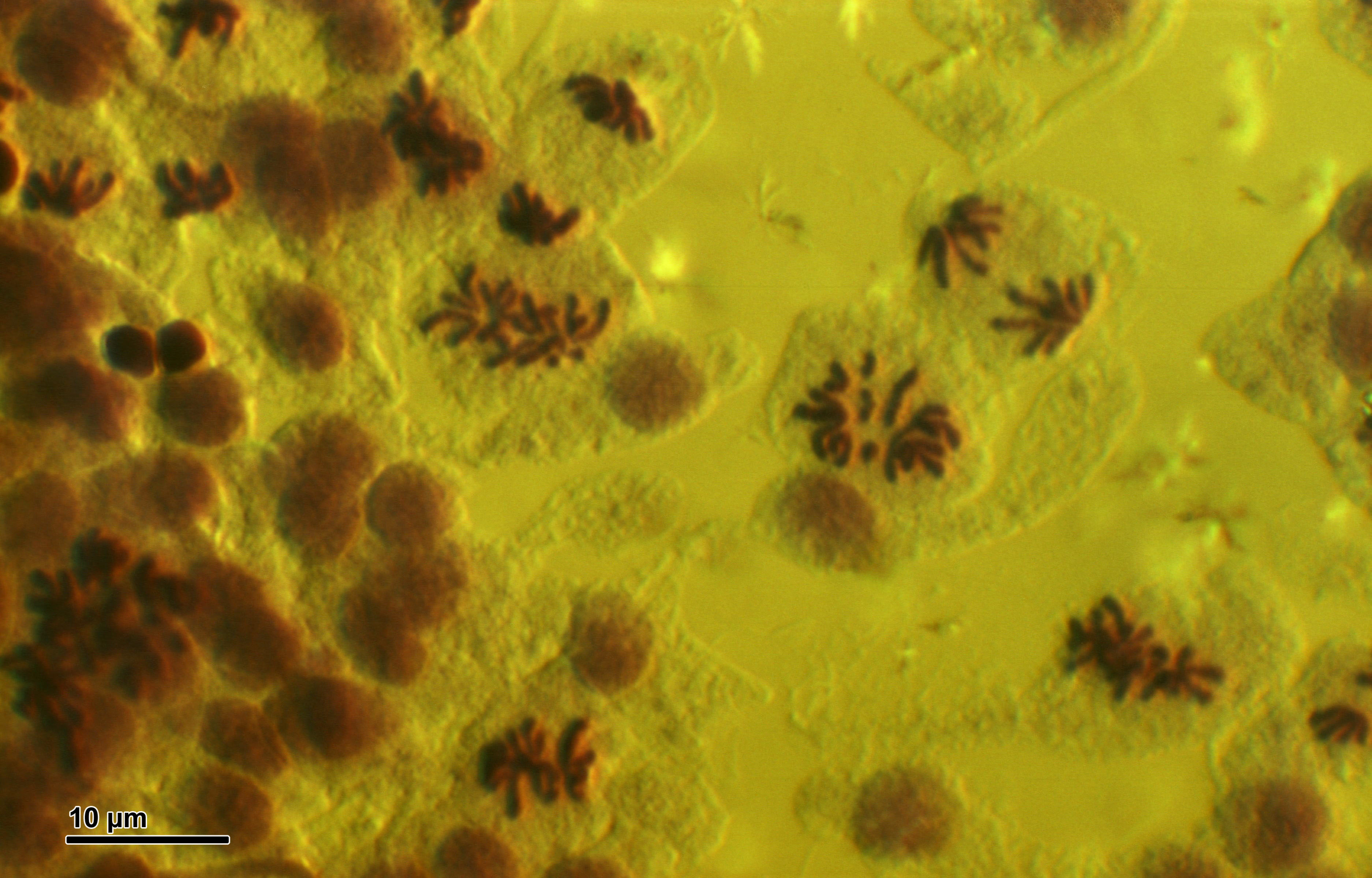
Spermatogonia going through mitosis to form primary spermatocytes in Grasshopper testes.

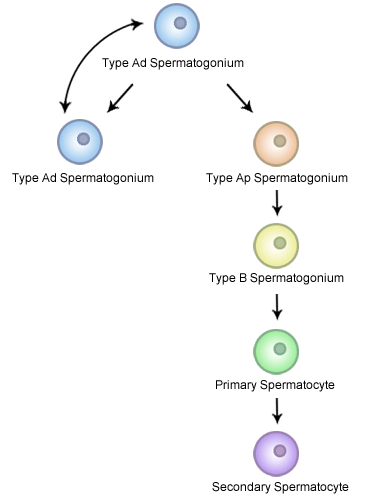
Spermatocytogenesis

At puberty, spermatogonia located along the walls of the seminiferous tubules within the testis will be initiated and start to divide mitotically, forming two types of A cells that contain an oval shaped nucleus with a nucleolus attached to the nuclear envelope; one is dark (Ad) and the other is pale (Ap). The Ad cells are spermatogonia that will stay in the basal compartment (outer region of the tubule); these cells are reserve spermatogonial stem cells that do not usually undergo mitosis. Type Ap are actively-dividing spermatogonial stem cells which begin differentiation to type B spermatogonia, which have round nuclei and heterochromatin attached to the nuclear envelope and the center of nucleolus. Type B cells will move on to the adluminal compartment (towards the inner region of tubule) and become primary spermatocytes; this process takes about 16 days to complete.

The primary spermatocytes within the adluminal compartment will continue on to meiosis I and divide into two daughters cells, known as secondary spermatocytes, a process which takes 24 days to complete. Each secondary spermatocyte will form two spermatids after meiosis II.

Although spermatocytes that divide mitotically and meiotically are sensitive to radiation and cancer, spermatogonial stem cells are not. Therefore, after termination of radiation therapy or chemotherapy, the spermatognia stems cells may re-initiate the formation of spermatogenesis.

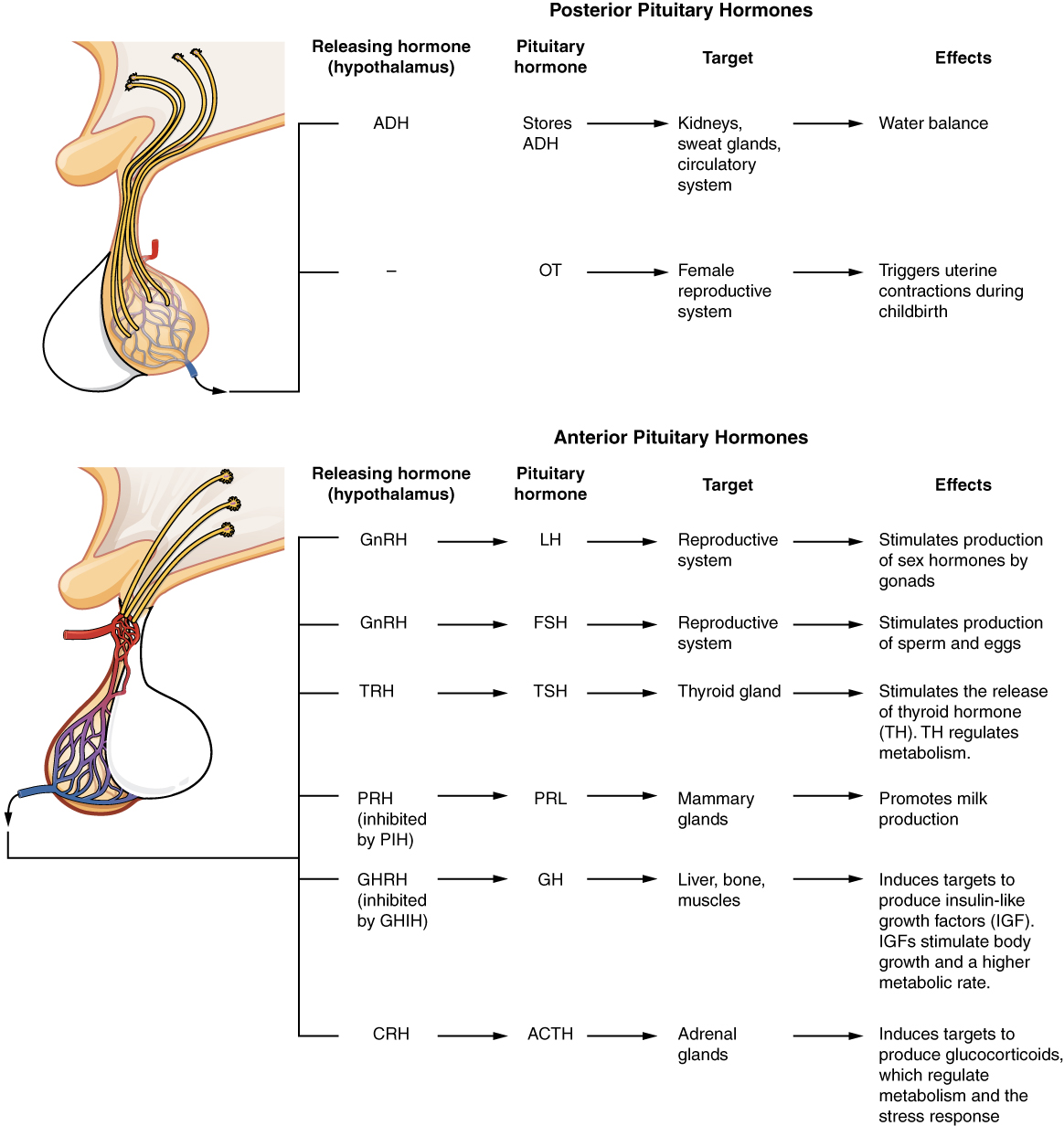
Hormones produced by the Pituitary gland. GnRH is secreted by the hypothalamus, which induces anterior pituitary to produce FSH and LH upon puberty.

=== Role of hormones ===
The formation of primary spermatocytes (a process known as spermatocytogenesis) begins in humans when a male is sexually matured at puberty, around the age of 10 through 14. Formation is initiated upon the pulsated surges of gonadotropin-releasing hormone (GnRH) from the hypothalamus, which leads to the secretion of follicle-stimulating hormone (FSH) and luteinizing hormone (LH) produced by the anterior pituitary gland. The release of FSH into the testes will enhance spermatogenesis and lead to the development of Sertoli cells, which act as nursing cells where spermatids will go to mature after meiosis II. LH promotes Leydig cell secretion of testosterone into the testes and blood, which induce spermatogenesis and aid the formation of secondary sex characteristics. From this point on, the secretion of FSH and LH (inducing production of testosterone) will stimulate spermatogenesis until the male dies. Increasing the hormones FSH and LH in males will not increase the rate of spermatogenesis. However, with age, the rate of production will decrease, even when the amount of hormone that is secreted is constant; this is due to higher rates of degeneration of germ cells during meiotic prophase.

=== Cell type summary ===
In the following table, ploidy, copy number and chromosome/chromatid counts listed are for a single cell, generally prior to DNA synthesis and division (in G_{1} if applicable). Primary spermatocytes are arrested after DNA synthesis and prior to division.

Cell	Type	Ploidy/Chromosomes in human	DNA copy number/Chromatids in human	Process entered by cell	Duration
spermatogonium (types Ad, Ap and B)	germ cells	diploid (2N) / 46	2C / 46	spermatocytogenesis (mitosis)	16 days
primary spermatocyte	male gametocyte	diploid (2N) / 46	4C / 2x46	spermatocytogenesis (meiosis I)	24 days
secondary spermatocyte	male gametocyte	haploid (N) / 23	2C / 46	spermatidogenesis (meiosis II)	A few hours
spermatids	male gametid	haploid (N) / 23	1C / 23	spermiogenesis	24 days
spermatozoids	sperm	haploid (N) / 23	1C / 23	spermiation	64 days (total)

== Physiology ==
=== Damage, repair, and failure ===
Spermatocytes regularly overcome double-strand breaks and other DNA damages in the prophase stage of meiosis. These damages can arise by the programmed activity of Spo11, an enzyme employed in meiotic recombination, as well as by un-programmed breakages in DNA, such as those caused by oxidative free radicals produced as products of normal metabolism. These damages are repaired by homologous recombination pathways and utilize RAD1 and γH2AX, which recognize double strand breaks and modify chromatin, respectively. As a result, double strand breaks in meiotic cells, unlike mitotic cells, do not typically lead to apoptosis, or cell death. Homologous recombinational repair (HRR) of double-strand breaks occurs in mice during sequential stages of spermatogenesis but is most prominent in spermatocytes. In spermatocytes, HRR events occur mainly in the pachytene stage of meiosis and the gene conversion type of HRR is predominant, whereas in other stages of spermatogenesis the reciprocal exchange type of HRR is more frequent. During mouse spermatogenesis, the mutation frequencies of cells at the different stages, including pachytene spermatocytes, are 5 to 10-fold lower than the mutation frequencies in somatic cells. Because of their elevated DNA repair capability, spermatocytes likely play a central role in the maintenance of these lower mutation rates, and thus in the preservation of the genetic integrity of the male germ line.

It is known that heterozygous chromosomal rearrangements lead to spermatogenic disturbance or failure; however the molecular mechanisms that cause this are not as well known. It is suggested that a passive mechanism involving asynaptic region clustering in spermatocytes is a possible cause. Asynaptic regions are associated with BRCA1, kinase ATR and γH2AX presence in pachytene spermatocytes.

== Specific mutations ==
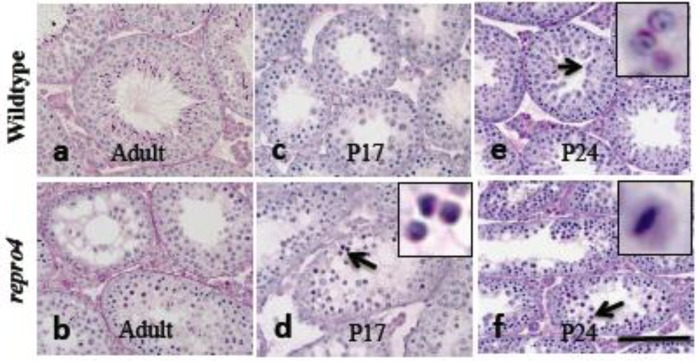
Wild-type spermatocyte progression compared to repro4 mutated spermatocytes.

The gene Stimulated By Retinoic Acid 8 (STRA8) is required for the retinoic-acid signaling pathway in humans, which leads to meiosis initiation. STRA8 expression is higher in preleptotene spermatocytes (at the earliest stage of prophase I in meiosis) than in spermatogonia. STRA8-mutant spermatocytes have been shown to be capable of meiosis initiation; however, they cannot complete the process. Mutations in leptotene spermatocytes can result in premature chromosome condensation.

Mutations in Mtap2, a microtubule-associated protein, as observed in repro4 mutant spermatocytes, have been shown to arrest spermatogenesis progress during the prophase of meiosis I. This is observed by a reduction in spermatid presence in repro4 mutants.

Recombinant-defective mutations can occur in Spo11, DMC1, ATM and MSH5 genes of spermatocytes. These mutations involve double strand break repair impairment, which can result in arrest of spermatogenesis at stage IV of the seminiferous epithelium cycle.

== History ==
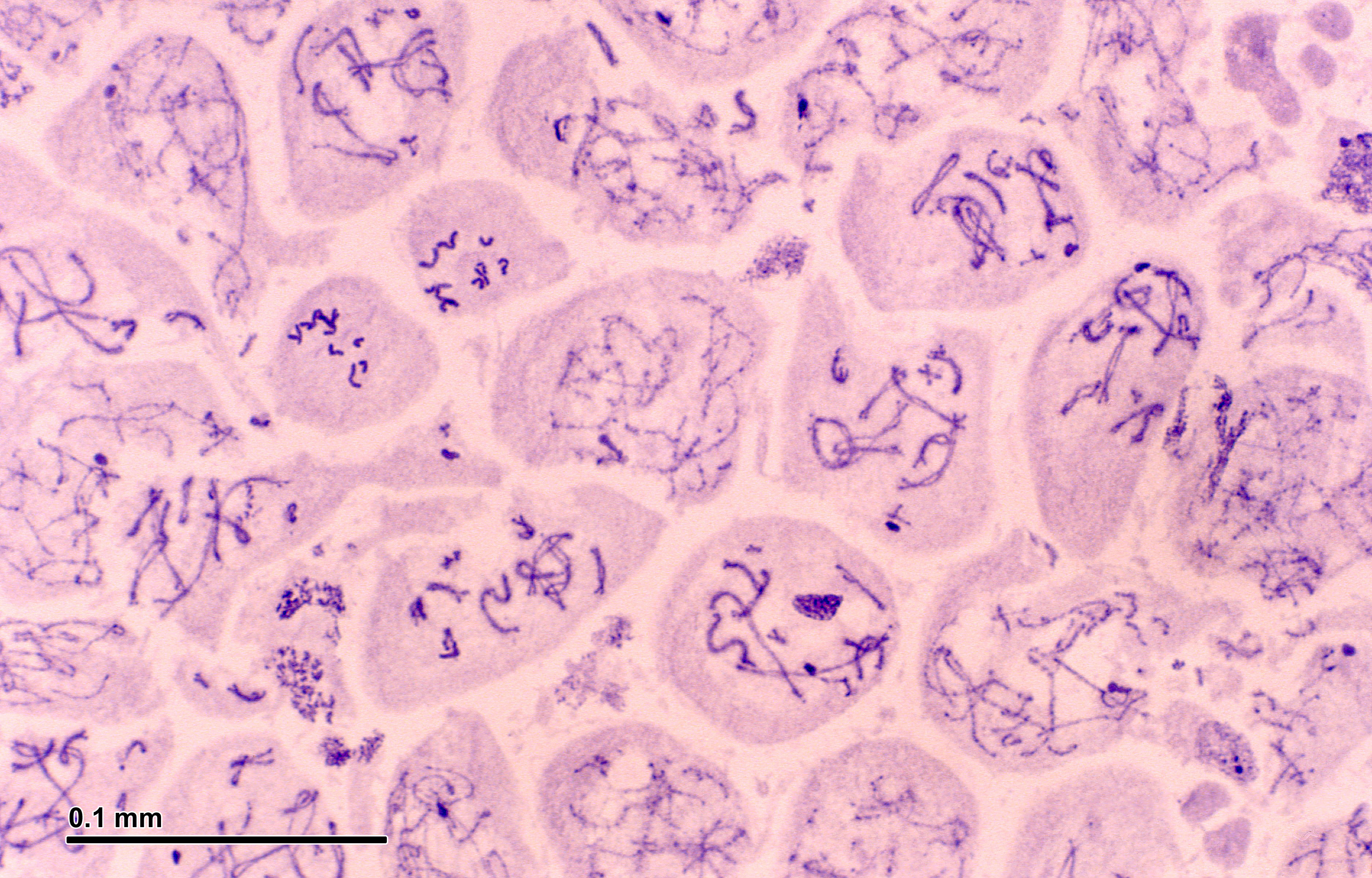
Meiosis in Grasshopper testes (primary spermatocytes in zygotene, pachytene, prophase I).

The spermatogenesis process has been elucidated throughout the years by researchers who divided the process into multiple stages or phases, depending on intrinsic (germ and Sertoli cells) and extrinsic (FSH and LH) factors. The spermatogenesis process in mammals as a whole, involving cellular transformation, mitosis, and meiosis, has been well studied and documented from the 1950s to 1980s. However, during the 1990s and 2000s researchers have focused around increasing understanding of the regulation of spermatogenesis via genes, proteins, and signaling pathways, and the biochemical and molecular mechanisms involved in these processes. Most recently, the environmental effects on spermatogenesis have become a focus as male infertility in men has become more prevalent.

An important discovery in the spermatogenesis process was the identification of the seminiferous epithelial cycle in mammals—work by C.P. Leblound and Y. Clermont in 1952 that studied the spermatogonia, spermatocyte layers and spermatids in rat seminiferous tubules. Another critical discovery was that of the hypothalamic-pituitary-testicular hormone chain, which plays a role in spermatogenesis regulation; this was studied by R. M. Sharpe in 1994.

== Other animals ==
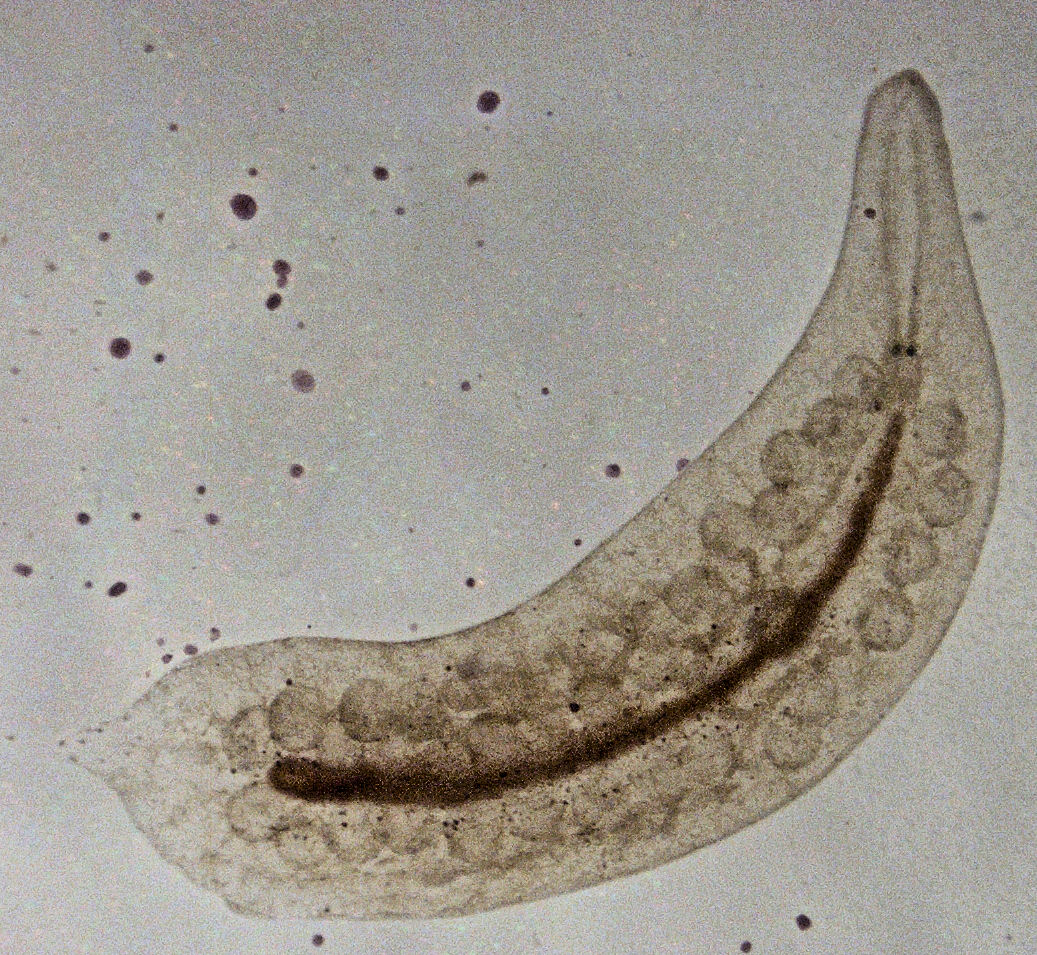
Mesostoma ehrenbergii

Primary cilia are common organelles found in eukaryotic cells; they play an important role in development of animals. Drosophila have unique properties in their spermatocyte primary cilia—they are assembled by four centrioles independently in the G2 phase and are sensitive to microtubule-targeting drugs. Normally, primary cilia will develop from one centriole in the G0/G1 phase and are not affected by microtubule targeting drugs.

Mesostoma ehrenbergii is a rhabdocoel flatworm with a distinctive male meiosis stage within the formation of spermatocytes. During the pre-anaphase stage, cleavage furrows are formed in the spermatocyte cells containing four univalent chromosomes. By the end of the anaphase stage, there is one at each pole moving between the spindle poles without actually having physical interactions with one another (also known as distance segregation). These unique traits allow researchers to study the force created by the spindle poles to allow the chromosomes to move, cleavage furrow management and distance segregation.

== See also ==
- Germ cells
- Gametes
- Gametocytogenesis
- Leydig
- Mitosis
- Meiosis
- Sertoli cells
- Spermatogenesis
- Spermatogonia
- Spermatid
- Spermatocytogenesis
- Spermatidogenesis
- Sperm
