= Gametocytogenesis =

Gametocytogenesis is the creation of gametocytes by mitotic division of gametogonia. Males and females of a species that reproduces sexually have different forms of gametocytogenesis:

- spermatocytogenesis (male)
- oocytogenesis (female)
