= Spermatogenesis =

Production of sperm

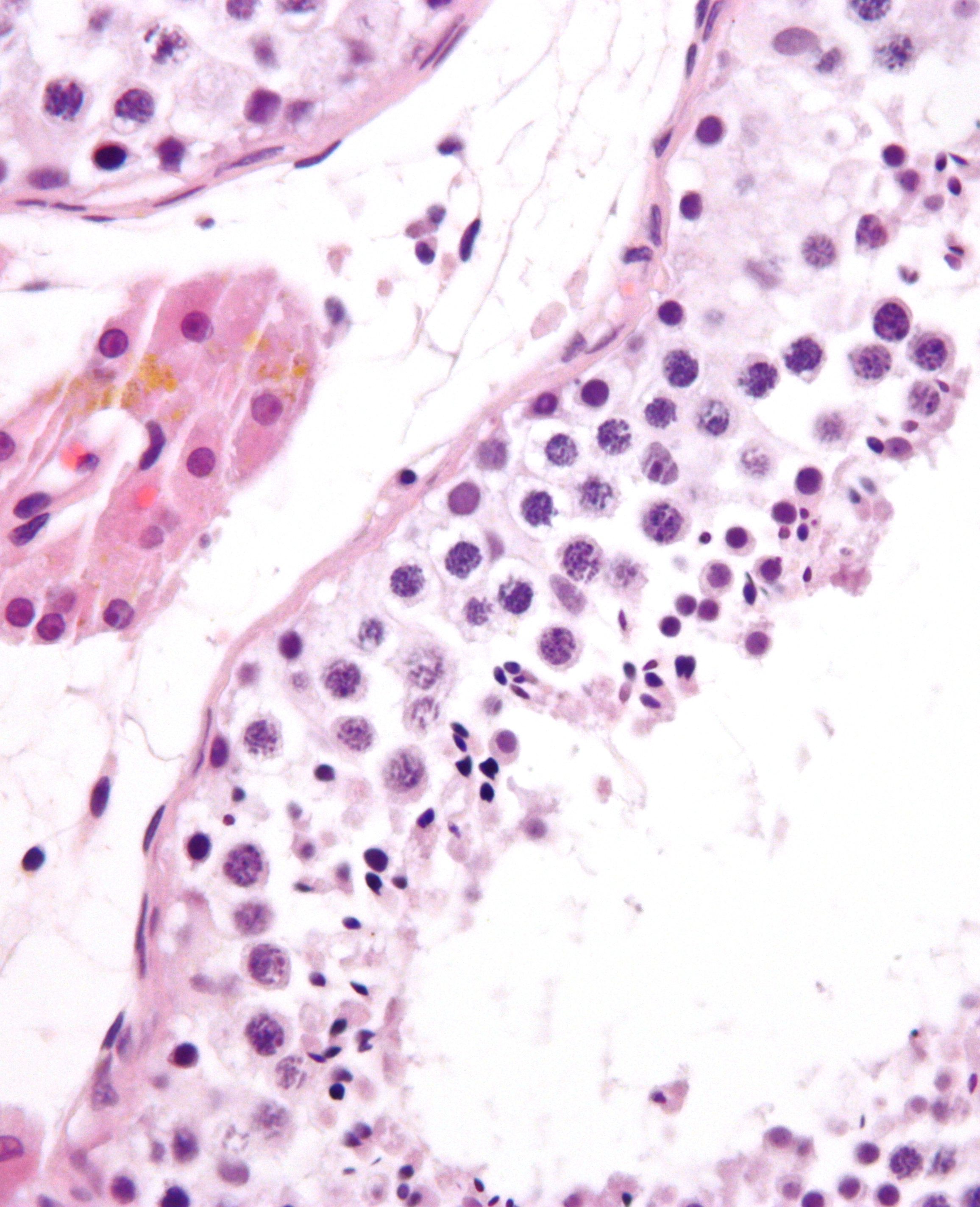
- Seminiferous tubule with maturing sperm. H&E stain.

- A mature human Spermatozoon

Identifiers
- MeSH: D013091

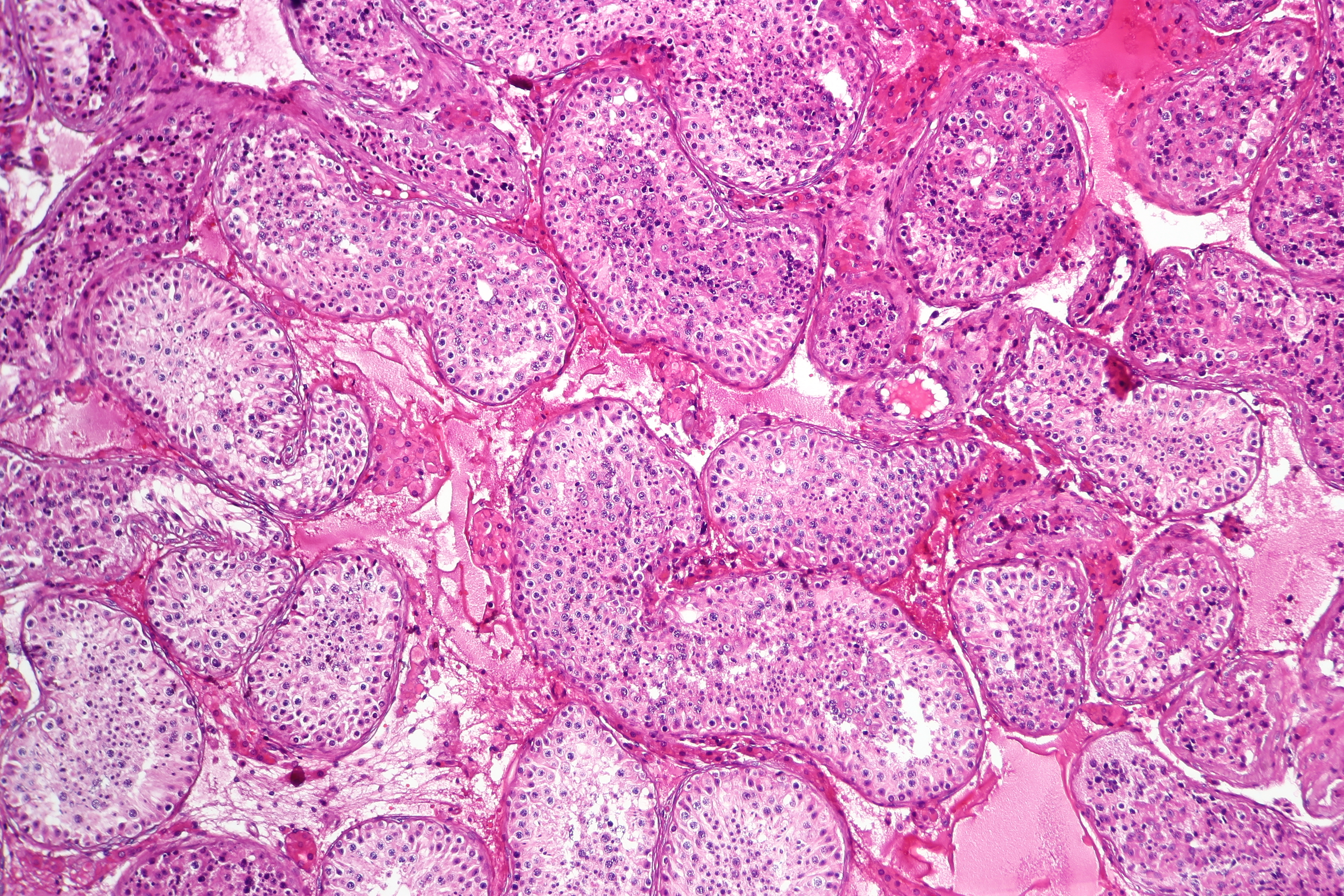
Normal spermatogenesis, testis biopsy.

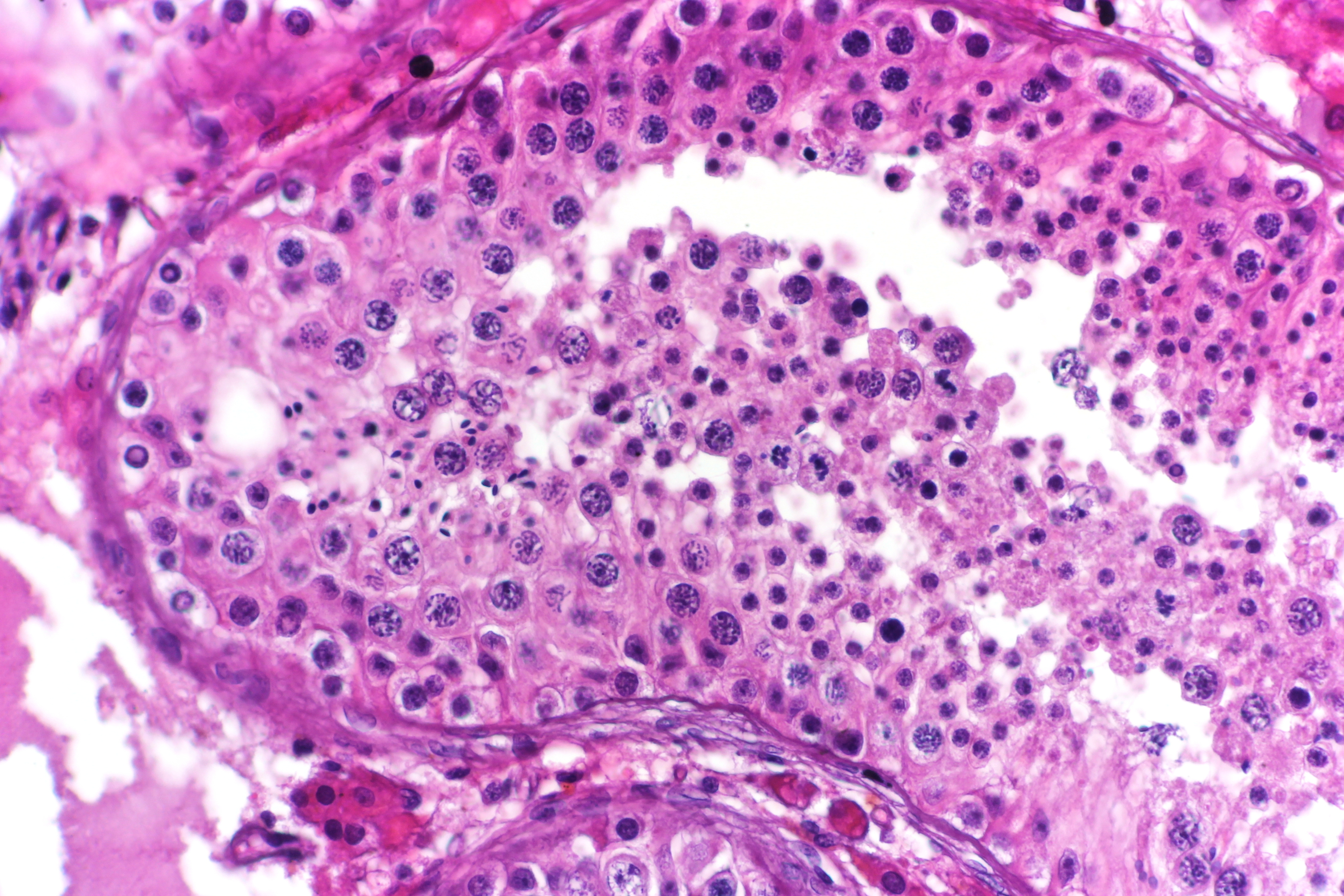
High-power view of a seminiferous tubule with normal spermatogenesis.

Spermatogenesis is the process by which haploid spermatozoa develop from germ cells in the seminiferous tubules of the testicle. This process starts with the mitotic division of the stem cells located close to the basement membrane of the tubules. These cells are called spermatogonial stem cells. The mitotic division of these produces two types of cells. Type A cells replenish the stem cells, and type B cells differentiate into primary spermatocytes. The primary spermatocyte divides meiotically (meiosis I ) into two secondary spermatocytes; each secondary spermatocyte divides into two equal haploid spermatids by meiosis II. The spermatids are transformed into spermatozoa (sperm) by the process of spermiogenesis. These develop into mature spermatozoa, also known as sperm cells. Thus, the primary spermatocyte gives rise to two cells, the secondary spermatocytes, and the two secondary spermatocytes by their subdivision produce four spermatozoa and four haploid cells.

Spermatozoa are the mature male gametes in many sexually reproducing organisms. Thus, spermatogenesis is the male version of gametogenesis, of which the female equivalent is oogenesis. In mammals it occurs in the seminiferous tubules of the male testes in a stepwise fashion. Spermatogenesis is highly dependent upon optimal conditions for the process to occur correctly, and is essential for sexual reproduction. DNA methylation and histone modification have been implicated in the regulation of this process. It starts during puberty and usually continues uninterrupted until death, although a slight decrease can be discerned in the quantity of produced sperm with increase in age (see Male infertility).

Spermatogenesis starts in the bottom part of seminiferous tubes and, progressively, cells go deeper into tubes and moving along it until mature spermatozoa reaches the lumen, where mature spermatozoa are deposited. The division happens asynchronically; if the tube is cut transversally one could observe different maturation states. A group of cells with different maturation states that are being generated at the same time is called a spermatogenic wave.

== Purpose ==
Spermatogenesis produces mature male gametes, commonly called sperm but more specifically known as spermatozoa, which are able to fertilize the counterpart female gamete, the oocyte, during conception to produce a single-celled individual known as a zygote. This is the cornerstone of sexual reproduction and involves the two gametes both contributing half the normal set of chromosomes (haploid) to result in a chromosomally normal (diploid) zygote.

To preserve the number of chromosomes in the offspring – which differs between species – one of each gamete must have half the usual number of chromosomes present in other body cells. Otherwise, the offspring will have twice the normal number of chromosomes, and serious abnormalities may result. In humans, chromosomal abnormalities arising from incorrect spermatogenesis results in congenital defects and abnormal birth defects (Down syndrome, Klinefelter syndrome) and in most cases, spontaneous abortion of the developing foetus.

== Location in humans ==
Spermatogenesis takes place within several structures of the male reproductive system. The initial stages occur within the testes and progress to the epididymis where the developing gametes mature and are stored until ejaculation. The seminiferous tubules of the testes are the starting point for the process, where Spermatogonial Stem Cells adjacent to the inner tubule wall divide in a centripetal direction—beginning at the walls and proceeding into the innermost part, or lumen—to produce immature sperm. Maturation occurs in the epididymis. The location [Testes/Scrotum] is important as the process of spermatogenesis requires a lower temperature to produce viable sperm, specifically 1°-8 °C lower than normal body temperature of 37 °C (98.6 °F). Clinically, small fluctuations in temperature, such as from an athletic support strap, cause no impairment in sperm viability or count.

== Duration ==
For humans, the entire process of spermatogenesis is variously estimated as taking between 72 and 74 days (according to tritium-labelled biopsies) and approximately 120 days (according to DNA clock measurements). Including the transport on ductal system, it takes 3 months. Testes produce 200 to 300 million spermatozoa daily. However, only about half or 100 million of these become viable sperm.

== Stages ==
The entire process of spermatogenesis can be broken up into several distinct stages, each corresponding to a particular type of cell in humans. In the following table, ploidy, copy number and chromosome/chromatid counts are for one cell, generally prior to DNA synthesis and division (in G1 if applicable). The primary spermatocyte is arrested after DNA synthesis and prior to division.

Cell type	ploidy/chromosomes in human	DNA copy number/chromatids in human	Process entered by cell
spermatogonium (types Ad, Ap and B)	diploid (2N) / 46	2C / 46	spermatocytogenesis (mitosis)
primary spermatocyte	diploid (2N) / 46	4C / 2 × 46	spermatidogenesis (meiosis I)
two secondary spermatocytes	haploid (N) / 23	2C / 2 × 23	spermatidogenesis (meiosis II)
four spermatids	haploid (N) / 23	C / 23	spermiogenesis
four functional spermatozoids	haploid (N) / 23	C / 23	spermiation

=== Spermatocytogenesis ===
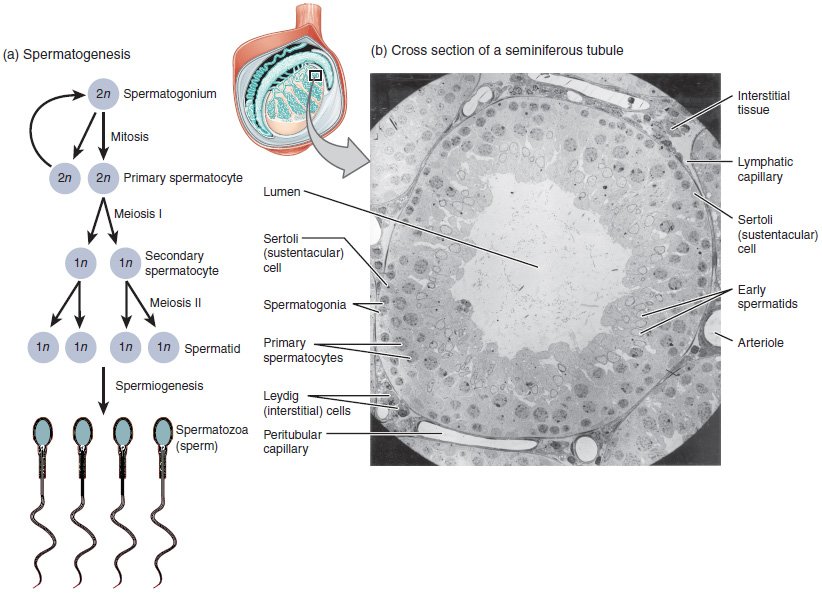
The process of spermatogenesis as the cells progress from primary spermatocytes, to secondary spermatocytes, to spermatids, to Sperm

Cycle of the seminiferous epithelium of the testis

Spermatocytogenesis is the male form of gametocytogenesis and results in the formation of spermatocytes possessing half the normal complement of genetic material. In spermatocytogenesis, a diploid spermatogonium, which resides in the basal compartment of the seminiferous tubules, divides mitotically, producing two diploid intermediate cells called primary spermatocytes. Each primary spermatocyte then moves into the adluminal compartment of the seminiferous tubules and duplicates its DNA and subsequently undergoes meiosis I to produce two haploid secondary spermatocytes, which will later divide once more into haploid spermatids. This division implicates sources of genetic variation, such as random inclusion of either parental chromosomes, and chromosomal crossover that increases the genetic variability of the gamete. The DNA damage response (DDR) machinery plays an important role in spermatogenesis. The protein FMRP binds to meiotic chromosomes and regulates the dynamics of the DDR machinery during spermatogenesis. FMRP appears to be necessary for the repair of DNA damage.

During spermatocytogenesis, meiosis employs special DNA repair processes that remove DNA damages and help maintain the integrity of the genome that is passed on to progeny. These DNA repair processes include homologous recombinational repair and non-homologous end joining

Each cell division from a spermatogonium to a spermatid is incomplete; the cells remain connected to one another by bridges of cytoplasm to allow synchronous development. Not all spermatogonia divide to produce spermatocytes; otherwise, the supply of spermatogonia would run out. Instead, spermatogonial stem cells divide mitotically to produce copies of themselves, ensuring a constant supply of spermatogonia to fuel spermatogenesis.

=== Spermatidogenesis ===
Spermatidogenesis is the creation of spermatids from secondary spermatocytes. Secondary spermatocytes produced earlier rapidly enter meiosis II and divide to produce haploid spermatids. The brevity of this stage means that secondary spermatocytes are rarely seen in histological studies.

=== Spermiogenesis ===
During spermiogenesis, the spermatids begin to form a tail by growing microtubules on one of the centrioles, which turns into basal body. These microtubules form an axoneme. Later the centriole is modified in the process of centrosome reduction. The anterior part of the tail (called midpiece) thickens because mitochondria are arranged around the axoneme to ensure energy supply. Spermatid DNA also undergoes packaging, becoming highly condensed. The DNA is packaged firstly with specific nuclear basic proteins, which are subsequently replaced with protamines during spermatid elongation. The resultant tightly packed chromatin is transcriptionally inactive. The Golgi apparatus surrounds the now condensed nucleus, becoming the acrosome.

Maturation then takes place under the influence of testosterone, which removes the remaining unnecessary cytoplasm and organelles. The excess cytoplasm, known as residual bodies, is phagocytosed by surrounding Sertoli cells in the testes. The resulting spermatozoa are now mature but lack motility. The mature spermatozoa are released from the protective Sertoli cells into the lumen of the seminiferous tubule in a process called spermiation.

The non-motile spermatozoa are transported to the epididymis in testicular fluid secreted by the Sertoli cells with the aid of peristaltic contraction. While in the epididymis the spermatozoa gain motility and become capable of fertilization. However, transport of the mature spermatozoa through the remainder of the male reproductive system is achieved via muscle contraction rather than the spermatozoon's recently acquired motility.

== Role of Sertoli cells ==
Labelled diagram of the organisation of Sertoli cells (red) and spermatocytes (blue) in the testis. Spermatids which have not yet undergone spermiation are attached to the lumenal apex of the cell

At all stages of differentiation, the spermatogenic cells are in close contact with Sertoli cells which are thought to provide structural and metabolic support to the developing sperm cells. A single Sertoli cell extends from the basement membrane to the lumen of the seminiferous tubule, although the cytoplasmic processes are difficult to distinguish at the light microscopic level.

Sertoli cells serve a number of functions during spermatogenesis, they support the developing gametes in the following ways:

- Maintain the environment necessary for development and maturation, via the blood-testis barrier
- Secrete substances initiating meiosis
- Secrete supporting testicular fluid
- Secrete androgen-binding protein (ABP), which concentrates testosterone in close proximity to the developing gametes
  - Testosterone is needed in very high quantities for maintenance of the reproductive tract, and ABP allows a much higher level of fertility
- Secrete hormones affecting pituitary gland control of spermatogenesis, particularly the polypeptide hormone, inhibin
- Phagocytose residual cytoplasm left over from spermiogenesis
- Secretion of anti-Müllerian hormone causes deterioration of the Müllerian duct
- Protect spermatids from the immune system of the male, via the blood-testis barrier
- Contribute to the spermatogonial stem cell niche

The intercellular adhesion molecules ICAM-1 and soluble ICAM-1 have antagonistic effects on the tight junctions forming the blood-testis barrier. ICAM-2 molecules regulate spermatid adhesion on the apical side of the barrier (towards the lumen).

== Influencing factors ==
The process of spermatogenesis is highly sensitive to fluctuations in the environment, particularly hormones and temperature. Testosterone is required in large local concentrations to maintain the process, which is achieved via the binding of testosterone by androgen binding protein present in the seminiferous tubules. Testosterone is produced by interstitial cells, also known as Leydig cells, which reside adjacent to the seminiferous tubules.

Seminiferous epithelium is sensitive to elevated temperature in humans and some other species, and will be adversely affected by temperatures as high as normal body temperature. In addition, spermatogonia do not achieve maturity at body temperature in most of mammals, as β-polimerase and spermatogenic recombinase need a specific optimal temperature. Consequently, the testes are located outside the body in a sac of skin called the scrotum. The optimal temperature is maintained at 2 °C (man) (8 °C mouse) below body temperature. This is achieved by regulation of blood flow and positioning towards and away from the heat of the body by the cremasteric muscle and the dartos smooth muscle in the scrotum.

One important mechanism is a thermal exchange between testicular arterial and venous blood streams. Specialized anatomic arrangements consist of two zones of coiling along the internal spermatic artery. This anatomic arrangement prolongs the time of contact and the thermal exchange between the testicular arterial and venous blood streams and may, in part, explain the temperature gradient between aortic and testicular arterial blood reported in dogs and rams. Moreover, reduction in pulse pressure, occurring in the proximal one third of the coiled length of the internal spermatic artery. Moreover, the activity of spermatogenic recombinase decreases, and this is supposed to be an important factor of testicles degeneration.

Dietary deficiencies (such as vitamins B, E and A), anabolic steroids, metals (cadmium and lead), x-ray exposure, dioxin, alcohol, and infectious diseases will also adversely affect the rate of spermatogenesis. In addition, the male germ line is susceptible to DNA damage caused by oxidative stress, and this damage likely has a significant impact on fertilization and pregnancy. According to the study by Omid Mehrpour et al exposure to pesticides also affects spermatogenesis.

== Hormonal control ==
Hormonal control of spermatogenesis varies among species. In humans the mechanism is not completely understood; however it is known that initiation of spermatogenesis occurs at puberty due to the interaction of the hypothalamus, pituitary gland and Leydig cells. If the pituitary gland is removed, spermatogenesis can still be initiated by follicle stimulating hormone (FSH) and testosterone. In contrast to FSH, luteinizing hormone (LH) appears to have little role in spermatogenesis outside of inducing gonadal testosterone production.

FSH stimulates both the production of androgen binding protein (ABP) by Sertoli cells, and the formation of the blood-testis barrier. ABP is essential to concentrating testosterone in levels high enough to initiate and maintain spermatogenesis. Intratesticular testosterone levels are 20–100 or 50–200 times higher than the concentration found in blood, although there is variation over a 5- to 10-fold range amongst healthy men. Testosterone production does not remain constant throughout the day, but follows a circadian rhythm. The maximum peak of testosterone occurs at 8 a.m., which explains why men frequently suffer from morning erections. In younger men, testosterone peaks are higher. FSH may initiate the sequestering of testosterone in the testes, but once developed only testosterone is required to maintain spermatogenesis. However, increasing the levels of FSH will increase the production of spermatozoa by preventing the apoptosis of type A spermatogonia. The hormone inhibin acts to decrease the levels of FSH. Studies from rodent models suggest that gonadotropins (both LH and FSH) support the process of spermatogenesis by suppressing the proapoptotic signals and therefore promote spermatogenic cell survival.

The Sertoli cells themselves mediate parts of spermatogenesis through hormone production. They are capable of producing the hormones estradiol and inhibin. The Leydig cells are also capable of producing estradiol in addition to their main product testosterone. Estrogen has been found to be essential for spermatogenesis in animals. However, a man with estrogen insensitivity syndrome (a defective ERα) was found to produce sperm with a normal sperm count, albeit with abnormally low sperm viability; whether he was sterile or not is unclear. Levels of estrogen that are too high can be detrimental to spermatogenesis due to suppression of gonadotropin secretion and by extension intratesticular testosterone production. The connection between spermatogenesis and prolactin levels appears to be moderate, with optimal prolactin levels reflecting efficient sperm production.

== Disorders ==
Disorders of spermatogenesis may cause oligospermia, which is semen with a low concentration of sperm and is a common finding in male infertility.

== See also ==
- Anisogamy
- Evolution of sexual reproduction
- Folliculogenesis
- Germ cells
- Male infertility
- Meiosis
- Oncofertility
- Oogenesis
- Origin and function of meiosis
- Sertoli cells
- Sexual reproduction
- Semen analysis
