= Spermiogenesis =

Final stage of spermatogenesis, involving spermatid maturation

The process of spermatogenesis. 1. Primary spermatocyte 2. Secondary spermatocytes 3. Spermatids 4. Sperm

Spermiogenesis is the final stage of spermatogenesis, during which the spermatids develop into mature spermatozoa. At the beginning of the stage, the spermatid is a more or less circular cell containing a nucleus, Golgi apparatus, centriole and mitochondria; by the end of the process, it has radically transformed into an elongated spermatozoon, complete with a head, midpiece, and tail.

== Phases ==
Complete diagram of a human spermatozoon

Schematic of subcellular structures in a murine spermatid being formed showing the formation of the residual body and acrosomal cap.

The process of spermiogenesis is traditionally divided into four stages: the Golgi phase, the cap phase, formation of the tail, and the maturation stage.

=== Golgi phase ===
The spermatids, which up until now have been mostly radially symmetrical, begin to develop polarity. The head forms at one end, where the Golgi apparatus creates enzymes that will become the acrosome. At the other end, it develops a thickened midpiece, where the mitochondria gather and the distal centriole begins to form an axoneme.

Spermatid DNA also undergoes packaging, becoming highly condensed. The DNA is first packaged with specific nuclear basic proteins, which are subsequently replaced with protamines during spermatid elongation. The resultant tightly packed chromatin is transcriptionally inactive.

=== Cap/acrosome phase ===
The Golgi apparatus surrounds the condensed nucleus, becoming the acrosomal cap.

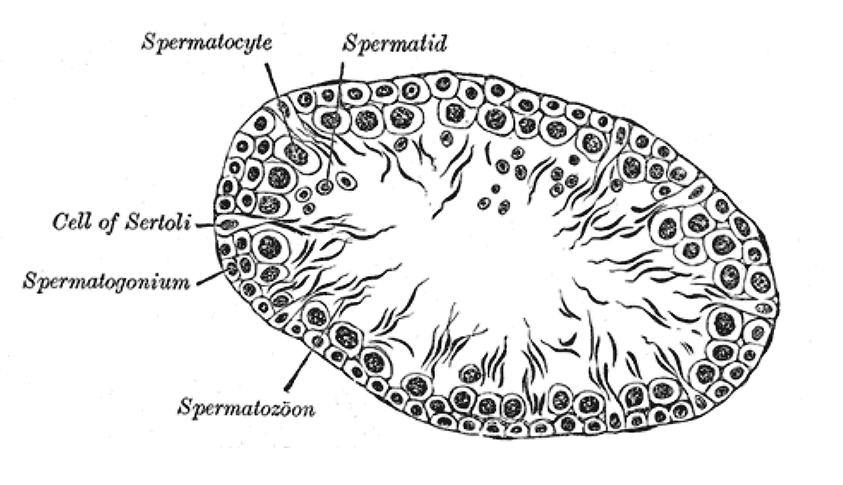
Note how the tails of the sperm point inward. This orientation occurs during the acrosomal phase.

=== Formation of tail ===
One of the centrioles of the cell elongates to become the tail of the sperm. A temporary structure called the "manchette" assists in this elongation.

During this phase, the developing spermatozoa orient themselves so that their tails point towards the center of the lumen, away from the epithelium.

=== Maturation phase ===
The excess cytoplasm, known as residual body of Regaud, is phagocytosed by surrounding Sertoli cells in the testes.

== Spermiation ==
The mature spermatozoa are released from the protective Sertoli cells into the lumen of the seminiferous tubule and a process called spermiation then takes place, which removes the remaining unnecessary cytoplasm and organelles.

The resulting spermatozoa are now mature but lack motility, rendering them sterile. The non-motile spermatozoa are transported to the epididymis in testicular fluid secreted by the Sertoli cells, with the aid of peristaltic contraction.

Whilst in the epididymis, they acquire motility. However, transport of the mature spermatozoa through the remainder of the male reproductive system is achieved via muscle contraction rather than the spermatozoon's motility. A glycoprotein coat over the acrosome prevents the sperm from fertilizing the egg prior to traveling through the male and female reproductive tracts. Capacitation of the sperm by the enzymes FPP (fertilization promoting peptide, produced in the prostate gland) and heparin (in the female reproductive tract) removes this coat and allows sperm to bind to the egg.

== Genome integrity ==
During spermiogenesis, the haploid post-meiotic stages of gametogenesis in males, several fundamental challenges are encountered.

1. After completion of the two meiotic divisions, chromatids become vulnerable to DNA double-strand damages, since accurate repair of such damages ordinarily requires availability of a sister chromatid or homologous chromosome, but these are now unavailable for long periods, i.e. days or weeks.
2. The sperm genome is unable to undergo transcription during spermiogenesis, impeding its ability to respond to new challenges, such as DNA damage.
3. Associated with proper genome packaging to create mature germ cells there is a transition from histone protein binding to protamine protein binding and this transition is associated with production of DNA double-strand breaks.

How these challenges are overcome is still not well understood.
