= Sertoli cell =

Cells found in human testes which help produce sperm

- Germinal epithelium of the testicle.: 1. basal lamina 2. spermatogonia 3. primary (1st-order) spermatocyte 4. secondary (2nd-order) spermatocyte 5. developing spermatid 6. mature spermatid 7. Sertoli cell 8. tight junction (blood-testis barrier)

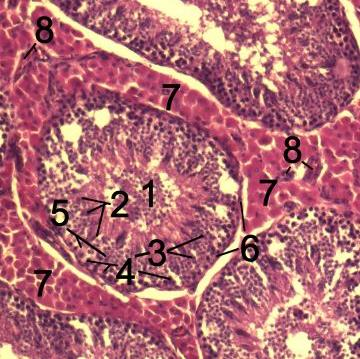
- Histological section through testicular parenchyma of a boar.: 1. lumen of Tubulus seminiferus contortus 2. spermatids 3. spermatocytes 4. spermatogonia 5. Sertoli cell 6. myofibroblasts 7. Leydig cells 8. capillaries

Details
- System: Reproductive system
- Location: Testes
- Function: Provide nourishment to the developing spermatozoa

Identifiers
- MeSH: D012708
- FMA: 72298

Sertoli cells are a type of sustentacular "nurse" cell found in human testes which contribute to the process of spermatogenesis (the production of sperm) as a structural component of the seminiferous tubules. They are activated by follicle-stimulating hormone (FSH) secreted by the adenohypophysis and express FSH receptor on their membranes.

== History ==
Sertoli cells are named after Enrico Sertoli, an Italian physiologist who discovered them while studying medicine at the University of Pavia, Italy. He published a description of his eponymous cell in 1865. The cell was discovered by Sertoli with a Belthle microscope which had been purchased in 1862. In the 1865 publication, his first description used the terms "tree-like cell" or "stringy cell"; most importantly, he referred to these as "mother cells". Other scientists later used Enrico's family name to label these cells in publications, beginning in 1888. As of 2006, two textbooks that are devoted specifically to the Sertoli cell have been published.

== Structure ==
Sertoli cells are specifically located in the convolutions of the seminiferous tubules, since this is the only place in the testes where spermatozoa are produced. As the primary support cell of the tubules, they are generally very large and amorphous, with individual cells stretching from the basal lamina to the lumen; their cytoplasm often completely surrounds the germline cells which they are responsible for nursing. Sertoli cells are easily confused with the other cells of the germinal epithelium when using standard staining techniques; the most distinctive feature of the Sertoli cell is its dark nucleolus.

== Development ==
Sertoli cells are required for male sexual development. Sertoli cell proliferation and differentiation is mainly activated by FGF9, with which they also form a feedforward loop. It has been suggested that Sertoli cells may derive from the fetal mesonephros. After puberty, Sertoli cells begin to elongate. Their nucleoli become larger and tight junctions are completed, creating a fluid-filled lumen space.

FSH is responsible for controlling the proliferation of Sertoli cells shortly after birth and stimulates the production of factors derived from Sertoli cells that control the development of the testes and germ cells. Actually FSH is required for Sertoli cell mitogen, which stimulates the expression of various cell markers. FSH, LH,TSH, and hCG belonging to pituitary glycoprotein hormone family are also known to perform important function during Sertoli cell development, thus influencing male reproductive health.

In addition, the involvement of thyroid hormones on Sertoli cell development have been extensively investigated and results indicated that thyroid hormones can significantly affect Sertoli cell proliferation and differentiation.

Once fully differentiated, the Sertoli cell is considered terminally differentiated, and is unable to proliferate. Therefore, once spermatogenesis has begun, no more Sertoli cells are created, and their population within the seminiferous tubules is finite.

Nevertheless, it has been demonstrated that Sertoli cells can revert to a functionally immature and proliferative phenotype in response to activin A. This gives rise to the possibility of repairing some defects of testicular niche cells which may cause male infertility.

== Function ==
Because its main function is to nourish developing sperm cells through the stages of spermatogenesis, the Sertoli cell has also been called the "mother" or "nurse" cell. Sertoli cells also act as phagocytes, consuming the residual cytoplasm during spermatogenesis. Translocation of cells from the basal lamina to the lumen of the seminiferous tubules occurs by conformational changes in the lateral margins of the Sertoli cells.

=== Secretory ===
Sertoli cells secrete the following substances:

- anti-Müllerian hormone (AMH), secreted during the early stages of fetal life
- inhibin and activins, secreted after puberty, work together to regulate FSH secretion
- androgen-binding protein (also called testosterone-binding globulin) increases testosterone concentration in the seminiferous tubules to lightly stimulate spermatogenesis
- estradiol - an aromatase converts testosterone to 1,7-beta-estradiol to direct spermatogenesis
- ETS Related Molecule or ERM transcription factor is needed for maintenance of the spermatogonial stem cells in the adult testis
- transferrin, a blood plasma protein for iron ion delivery
- testicular ceruloplasmin, a ceruloplasmin-like protein which is immunologically similar to serum ceruloplasmin.

=== Structural ===
The occluding junctions of Sertoli cells form the blood–testis barrier, a structure that partitions the interstitial blood compartment of the testis from the adluminal compartment of the seminiferous tubules. Because of the apical progression of the spermatogonia, the occluding junctions must be dynamically reformed and broken to allow the immunoidentical spermatogonia to cross through the blood-testis barrier so that they can become immunologically unique. Sertoli cells control the entry and exit of nutrients, hormones, and other chemicals into the tubules of the testis as well as make the adluminal compartment an immune-privileged site.

Sertoli cells are also responsible for establishing and maintaining the spermatogonial stem cell niche, which ensures the renewal of stem cells and the differentiation of spermatogonia into mature germ cells that progress stepwise through the long process of spermatogenesis, ending in the release of spermatozoa in a process known as spermiation. Sertoli cells bind to spermatogonial cells via N-cadherins and galactosyltransferase (via carbohydrate residues).

=== Other functions ===
During spermatogenesis, Sertoli cells provide nutrition to the spermatogonia.

Sertoli cells are capable of repairing DNA damage. This repair likely employs the process of non-homologous end joining involving XRCC1 and PARP1 proteins that are expressed in Sertoli cells.

Sertoli cells have a higher mutation frequency than spermatogenic cells. Compared to spermatocytes, the mutation frequency is about 5 to 10-fold higher in Sertoli cells. This may reflect the need for greater efficiency of DNA repair and mutation avoidance in the germ line than in somatic cells.

=== Immunomodulatory properties of Sertoli cells ===
Besides expressing factors that are crucial for sperm cell maturation, Sertoli cells also produce a wide range of molecules (either on their surface or soluble) that are able to modify the immune system. The ability of Sertoli cells to change the immune response in the tubule is needed for successful sperm cell maturation. Sperm cells express neo-epitopes on their surface as they progress through different stages of maturation, which can trigger a strong immune response if placed in a different part of the body.

==== Molecules produced by Sertoli cells associated with immunosuppression or immunoregulation ====
FAS/FAS-L system – expression of Fas ligand (Fas-L) on the surface of SCs activates apoptotic death of Fas receptor-bearing cells, e.g. cytotoxic T cells.

- soluble FasL: increasing the effectivity of the system

- soluble Fas: FasL blockage on the surface of other cells (no apoptotic induction in Sertoli cells by immune cells)

B7/H1 – decreasing proliferation of effector T-cells

Jagged1 (JAG1) – induction of Foxp3 transcription factor expression in naive T lymphocytes (increasing relative numbers of T regulatory cells)

Protease inhibitor-9 (PI-9) – member of serpin family (serine protease inhibitors), which induces secretion of protease Granzyme B, cytotoxic T-cells and NK cells are able to induce apoptosis in target cell. SCs produce PI-9 that irreversibly bonds Granzyme B and inhibits its activity.

CD59, a surface molecule on SCs and a member of the complement regulatory proteins (CRP), inhibits the last step of the complement cascade, the formation of the membrane attack complex.

Clusterin, a soluble molecule with functions similar to CD59, forms a complex with Granzyme B and inhibits activation of apoptosis by T-lymphocytes or NK cells.

TGF-beta, a transforming growth factor beta (its direct production by SCs is controversial), contributes to the induction of regulatory T-cells on the periphery.

==== Other molecules ====
CD40, a molecule associated with dendritic cells (DCs). SCs are able to down regulate the expression of CD40 on the surface of DCs, by an unknown mechanism. Downregulation of CD40 results in the decreased ability of DCs to stimulate the T-cell response.

Sertoli cells are also able to inhibit the migration of immune cells by lowering immune cell infiltration to the site of inflammation.

== Clinical significance ==
Sertoli–Leydig cell tumour is part of the sex cord-stromal tumour group of ovarian neoplasms. These tumors produce both Sertoli and Leydig cells and lead to an increased secretion of testosterone in ovaries and testicles.

== Other animals ==
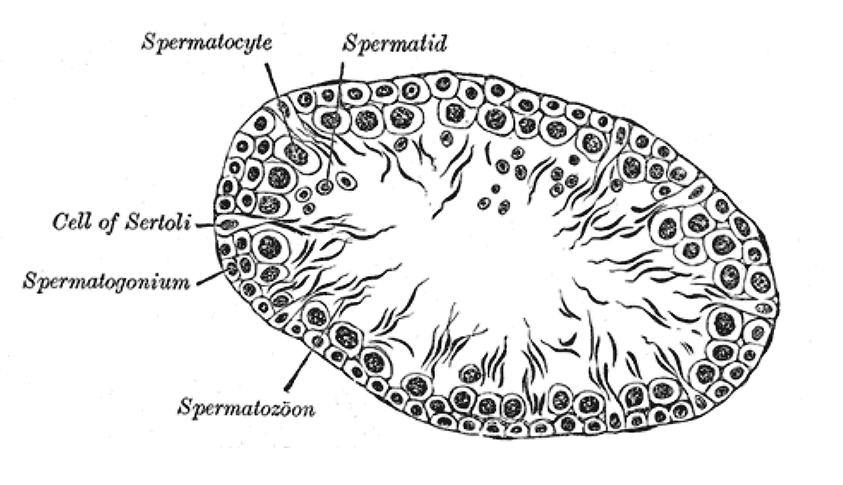
Cross-section of a seminiferous tubule of the testis of a rat (250x)

The function of Sertoli cells in the Amniota and Anamniota is the same, but they have slightly different properties when compared to each other. Anamnionts (fish and amphibians) employ cystic spermatogenesis in order to produce sperm cells. In the Amniota, Sertoli cells are terminally differentiated cells which are normally incapable of proliferating. In the Anamniota, Sertoli cells go through two proliferative phases. The first phase of proliferation occurs during cyst establishment, promoting the migration of germ cells into it. The second phase involves enlargement of the cyst which produces space for the proliferating germ cells.

The once commonly accepted fact that Sertoli cells are unable to divide and proliferate in Amniota has recently been challenged. Upon xenogenic transplantation, Sertoli cells have been shown to regain the ability to proliferate.

== Research ==
Recently (2016), experimental models of autoimmune inflammatory disorders, including diabetes, have prompted the implication of Sertoli cells into cell therapy transplantation thanks to their immunoregulatory and anti-inflammatory properties.

Research into adapting Sertoli cells for use in the treatment of type I diabetes mellitus involves the strategy of cotransplanting β cells together with Sertoli cells into the recipient organism. In mice, rats, and humans, the presence of these cells restored glucose homeostasis as well as lowered requirements for external insulin. In all cases no immunosuppression was used, and the role of this medication was taken and provided by SC.

By treating spontaneously diabetic and obese mice with the transplantation of microencapsulated Sertoli cells in subcutaneous abdominal fat deposits, Giovanni et al. demonstrated that more than half of the treated mice showed improved glucose homeostasis. This recent scientific work promises a future better treatment to patients with type 2 diabetes mellitus through the use of cell therapy.

Sertoli cells promote skin graft acceptance by the recipient organism and their presence also helps to increase the numbers of motor neurons in the spinal cord of SOD1 mice (a mouse model used in the study of amyotrophic lateral sclerosis).

== See also ==
- Sertoli cell-only syndrome
- Sertoli cell nodule
- List of distinct cell types in the adult human body
