= Acrosome =

Organelle of sperm cells

Diagram of a human spermatozoa showing the acrosome

The acrosome is an organelle that develops over the anterior (front) half of the head in the spermatozoa (sperm cells) of humans and many other animals. It is a cap-like structure derived from the Golgi apparatus. In placental mammals, the acrosome contains degradative enzymes (including hyaluronidase and acrosin). These enzymes break down the outer membrane of the ovum, called the zona pellucida, allowing the haploid nucleus in the sperm cell to join with the haploid nucleus in the ovum. This shedding of the acrosome, known as the acrosome reaction, can be stimulated in vitro by substances that a sperm cell may encounter naturally, such as progesterone or follicular fluid, as well as the more commonly used calcium ionophore A23187. This can be done to serve as a positive control when assessing the acrosome reaction of a sperm sample by flow cytometry or fluorescence microscopy. This is usually done after staining with a fluoresceinated lectin such as FITC-PNA, FITC-PSA, FITC-ConA, or fluoresceinated antibody such as FITC-CD46.

In the case of globozoospermia (sperm with round heads), the Golgi apparatus is not transformed into the acrosome, causing male infertility.

== See also ==
- Acroplaxome
