= Evolutionary ideas of the Scientific Revolution and Enlightenment =

Changes in evolutionary philosophies

Evolutionary ideas during the periods of the Scientific Revolution and the Enlightenment developed over a time when natural history became more sophisticated during the 17th and 18th centuries, and as the Scientific Revolution and the rise of mechanical philosophy encouraged viewing the natural world as a machine with workings capable of analysis. But the evolutionary ideas of the early 18th century were of a religious and spiritual nature. In the second half of the 18th century more materialistic and explicit ideas about biological evolution began to emerge, adding further strands in the history of evolutionary thought.

== 17th and early 18th century ==
The word evolution (from the Latin evolutio, meaning "to unroll like a scroll") appeared in English in the 17th century, referring to an orderly sequence of events, particularly one in which the outcome was somehow contained within it from the start. Notably, in 1677 Sir Matthew Hale, attacking the atheistic atomism of Democritus and Epicurus, used the term evolution to describe his opponent's ideas that vibrations and collisions of atoms in the void — without divine intervention — had formed "Primordial Seeds" (semina) which were the "immediate, primitive, productive Principles of Men, Animals, Birds and Fishes." For Hale, this mechanism was "absurd", because "it must have potentially at least the whole Systeme of Humane Nature, or at least that Ideal Principle or Configuration thereof, in the evolution whereof the complement and formation of the Humane Nature must consist ... and all this drawn from a fortuitous coalition of senseless and dead Atoms."

While Hale first used the term evolution in arguing against the exact mechanistic view the word would come to symbolize, he also demonstrates that at least some evolutionist theories explored between 1650 and 1800 postulated that the universe, including life on Earth, had developed mechanically, entirely without divine guidance. Around this time, the mechanical philosophy of Descartes, reinforced by the physics of Galileo and Newton, began to encourage the machine-like view of the universe which would come to characterise the Scientific Revolution. However, most contemporary theories of evolution, including those developed by the German idealist philosophers Schelling and Hegel (and mocked by Schopenhauer), held that evolution was a fundamentally spiritual process, with the entire course of natural and human evolution being "a self-disclosing revelation of the Absolute".

Typical of these theorists, Gottfried Leibniz postulated in 1714 that "monads" inside objects caused motion by internal forces, and maintained that "the 'germs' of all things have always existed ... [and] contain within themselves an internal principle of development which drives them on through a vast series of metamorphoses" to become the geological formations, lifeforms, psychologies, and civilizations of the present. Leibniz clearly felt that evolution proceeded on divine principles — in his De rerum originatione radicali (1697), he wrote: "A cumulative increase of the beauty and universal perfection of the works of God, a perpetual and unrestricted progress of the universe as a whole must be recognized, such that it advances to a higher state of cultivation." Others, such as J. G. von Herder, expressed similar ideas.

Between 1603 and 1613 Sir Walter Raleigh was a prisoner in the Tower of London awaiting execution; in this period he wrote a history of the world in five volumes where he described his American experiences and adventures, in it he wondered whether all the new species discovered in the new continent could have found their place on Noah's Ark, a very serious question at the time. He postulated that only animals from the old continent found place on the Ark; eventually, after the Flood, some of these animals would migrate to the new continent and, under environmental pressure, change their appearances to create new species. Fifty years later, Matthew Hale went even further, and said that only the prototypes of all animal species were welcomed on the Ark; these would eventually differentiate after their release. Many clergymen were happy with Raleigh and Hale ideas since they appeared to solve the problem of the Ark's tonnage.

== Mid 18th century ==
In his Venus Physique in 1745, and System of Nature in 1751, Pierre Louis Maupertuis veered toward more materialist ground. He wrote of natural modifications occurring during reproduction and accumulating over the course of many generations, producing races and even new species. He also anticipated in general terms the idea of natural selection.

Vague and general ideas of evolution continued to proliferate among the mid-eighteenth century Enlightenment philosophers. G. L. L. Buffon suggested that what most people referred to as species were really just well-marked varieties. He thought that the members of what was then called a genus (which in terms of modern scientific classification would be considered a family) are all descended from a single, common ancestor. The ancestor of each family had arisen through spontaneous generation; environmental effects then caused them to diverge into different species. He speculated that the 200 or so species of mammals then known might have descended from as few as 38 original forms. Buffon's concept of evolution was strictly limited. He believed there were "internal molds" that shaped the spontaneous generation of each family and that the families themselves were entirely and eternally distinct. Thus, lions, tigers, leopards, pumas and house cats could all share a common ancestor, but dogs and house cats could not. Although Darwin's foreword to his 6th edition of Origin credited Aristotle with foreshadowing the concept of natural selection, he also wrote that "the first author who in modern times has treated it in a scientific spirit was Buffon".

Some 18th-century writers speculated about human evolution. John Mitchell, a physician and cartographer, wrote a book in 1744 called An Essay upon the Causes of the Different Colours of People in Different Climates in which he claimed that the first race on earth had been a brown and reddish colour he said "that an intermediate tawny colour found amongst Asiatics and Native Amerindians" had been the “original complexion of mankind” and that others races came about by the original race spending generations in different climates. Between 1767 and 1792 James Burnett, Lord Monboddo included in his writings not only the concept that man had descended from other primates, but also that, in response to their environment, creatures had found methods of transforming their characteristics over long time intervals. He also produced research on the evolution of linguistics, which was cited by Erasmus Darwin in his poem Temple of Nature. Jan-Andrew Henderson states that Monboddo was the first to articulate the theory of natural selection.

In 1792, the philosopher Immanuel Kant presented, in his Critique of Judgement, what he referred to as “a daring venture of reason”, in which “one organic being [is] derived from another organic being, although from one which is specifically different; e.g., certain water-animals transform themselves gradually into marsh-animals and from these, after some generations, into land-animals.” Some 20th-century philosophers, such as Eric Voegelin, credit Kant with foreshadowing modern evolutionary theory.

In 1796, Erasmus Darwin published his Zoönomia, which suggested "that all warm-blooded animals have arisen from one living filament ... with the power of acquiring new parts" in response to stimuli, with each round of improvements being inherited by successive generations. In his 1802 poem Temple of Nature, he described the rise of life from minute organisms living in the mud to its modern diversity:

First forms minute, unseen by spheric glass,
Move on the mud, or pierce the watery mass;
These, as successive generations bloom,
New powers acquire and larger limbs assume;
Whence countless groups of vegetation spring,
And breathing realms of fin and feet and wing.

== See also ==
- Alternatives to Darwinism
- Transmutation of species
- Romanticism in evolution theory
