= Evolution in Mendelian Populations =

1931 scientific paper by Sewall Wright

"Evolution in Mendelian Populations" is a lengthy 1931 scientific paper on evolution by the American population geneticist Sewall Wright.

The paper was first published in Genetics volume 16, pages 97–159. In it, Wright outlines various concepts, including genetic drift, effective population size, and inbreeding.

A contemporary review by R.A. Fisher can be found here

== Overview ==
Studiers of evolution such as Jean-Baptiste Lamarck and those who postulated the inheritance of acquired characteristics (e.g. Theodor Eimer and Edward Drinker Cope) were concerned with heredity and sought a link between one generation to the next. Lamarck thought that bodily responses from one generation should be passed along to future generations, which Wright refers to as "direct evolution". Sewall Wright expresses that the birth of genetics stems from Mendelian inheritance principles and so "any theory of evolution" must also be based on Mendelian inheritance.

== See also ==
- Evolutionary biology
