= Wintrebert =

Wintrebert is a surname. Notable people with the surname include:

- Joëlle Wintrebert (born 1949), French writer
- Paul Wintrebert (1867–1966), French embryologist
