= Kerstin Lindblad-Toh =

Swedish professor in comparative genomics

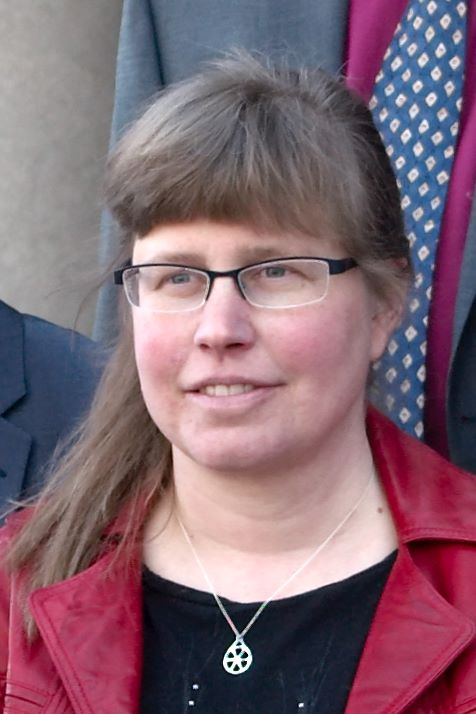
- Lindblad-Toh in 2013
- Born: June 13, 1970 (age 56); Stockholm, Sweden
- Citizenship: Swedish and American
- Known for: The 200 Mammals Project, Mammalian Genomes, Dog Disease Genetics
- Scientific career
- Fields: Comparative Genomics, Human Genetics, Immunology, Cancer
- Institutions: Broad Institute and Uppsala University
- Thesis: (1998)

Kerstin Lindblad-Toh is a scientist in comparative genomics, specializing in mammalian genetics. She is the Scientific Director of vertebrate genomics at the Broad Institute and a professor in comparative genomics at Uppsala University. In 2010 she co-founded Science for Life Laboratory (SciLifeLab) together with Mathias Uhlén and acted as Co-Director until 2015. As the leader of the Broad Institute's Mammalian Genome Initiative she has led the effort to sequence and analyze the genomes of various mammals, including mouse, dog, chimpanzee, horse, rabbit and opossum. She has researched extensively on the genetics of dogs, identifying genes and genetic variants important in disease susceptibility, morphology and behavior.

In 2015, she started the Zoonomia Project, named after the medical work (1794–96) by Erasmus Darwin.

Lindblad-Toh is elected to the National Academy of Sciences of the United States and the Royal Swedish Academy of Sciences.

== Education and early career ==
Lindblad-Toh was born 1970 in Stockholm, Sweden. She studied molecular biology as an undergraduate at Karolinska Institute. In 1998, she received her Ph.D. from the Department of Molecular Medicine at Karolinska Institute. She worked on several projects as a postdoctoral fellow at the Whitehead Institute/MIT Center for Genome Research together with Eric Lander, including mouse SNP discovery, the development of genotyping technologies and association studies in human disease. In 2002, she co-authored the paper describing the initial genome sequence of the mouse, and in 2005 she published the first genome sequence of the domestic dog.

== Awards and honors ==
- European Young Investigator Award, 2007
- The Swedish Fernström Prize, 2009
- Thuréus Prize, 2010
- Elected member of the Royal Swedish Academy of Sciences, 2012
- Wallenberg Scholar, 2013
- Distinguished Professor Grant, Swedish Research Council, 2014
- Göran Gustafsson Prize, 2013
- Björkén Prize, 2017
- Honorary doctorate of veterinary medicine by the Faculty of Veterinary Medicine and Animal Science at the Swedish University of Agricultural Sciences, 2019
- Elected to the National Academy of Sciences of the United States, 2020
- Uppsala University’s Rudbeck Medal, 2025
