= Herbert Graham Cannon =

British zoologist (1897–1963)

Cannon in 1935.

Herbert Graham Cannon FRS FRSE FLS FRMS (14 April 1897 – 6 January 1963) was a leading English zoologist and keen supporter of Lamarckism.

== Life ==
He was born in Wimbledon, London, on 14 April 1897 to David William Cannon, a compositor with Eyre & Spottiswoode, the third of four children. The family moved to Brixton when he was young. He won a scholarship and attended Wilson’s Grammar School in Camberwell, later winning a further scholarship to study zoology at Christ's College, Cambridge. He graduated with a BA from the University of Cambridge in 1918.

From 1920 to 1926 he lectured at University College London. In 1926 he received a professorship from Sheffield University. The bulk of his academic career, however, was spent as Beyer Professor of Zoology at Manchester University, 1931 to 1963.

In 1927 he was elected a Fellow of the Royal Society of Edinburgh, his proposers including James Hartley Ashworth. In 1935 he became a Fellow of the Royal Society of London.

Cannon's Lamarckian views were heavily criticized by biologist Theodosius Dobzhansky. Regarding his research, science historian Peter J. Bowler has written:

Cannon did extensive work on the functional morphology of arthropod feeding mechanisms in the 1920s, although his work was typical of the period in which phylogenetic considerations had dropped into the background even where the morphological tradition was continued. He did stress the role of habit in determining feeding structures, although his explicit support for Lamarckism came out only much later in his career.

His student was the entomologist Sidnie Manton.

== Marriage and death ==
Cannon was married to Annie Helen Fyfe. He died in hospital in London on 6 January 1963.

== Artistic recognition ==
Several bromide prints of Cannon, made by Walter Stoneman, are held by the National Gallery in London.

== Publications ==
Articles

- Cannon, Herbert Graham. (1957). What Lamarck Really Said. Proceedings of the Linnean Society of London 168: 70-87.
- Cannon, Herbert Graham. (1960). The Myth of the Inheritance of Acquired Characters. New Scientist. pp. 798–800.

Books

- Nebaliacea (1931)
- On the Rock-Boring Barnacle (1935)
- A Method of Illustration for Scientific Papers (1936)
- The John Murray expedition to the Indian Ocean (1940)
- Ostracoda (1940)
- The Evolution of Living Things (1958)
- Lamarck and Modern Genetics (1959)
