= Pangenesis =

Darwin's proposed mechanism for heredity

Charles Darwin's pangenesis theory postulated that every part of the body emits tiny particles called gemmules which migrate to the gonads and are transferred to offspring. Gemmules were thought to develop into their associated body parts as offspring matures. The theory implied that changes to the body during an organism's life would be inherited, as proposed in Lamarckism.

Pangenesis was Charles Darwin's hypothetical mechanism for heredity, in which he proposed that each part of the body continually emitted its own type of small organic particles called gemmules that aggregated in the gonads, contributing heritable information to the gametes.

He presented this 'provisional hypothesis' in his 1868 work The Variation of Animals and Plants Under Domestication, intending it to fill what he perceived as a major gap in evolutionary theory at the time. The etymology of the word comes from the Greek words pan (a prefix meaning "whole", "encompassing") and genesis ("birth") or genos ("origin").

Pangenesis mirrored ideas originally formulated by Hippocrates and other pre-Darwinian scientists, but using new concepts such as cell theory, explaining cell development as beginning with gemmules which were specified to be necessary for the occurrence of new growths in an organism, both in initial development and regeneration. It also accounted for regeneration and the Lamarckian concept of the inheritance of acquired characteristics, as a body part altered by the environment would produce altered gemmules. This made Pangenesis popular among the neo-Lamarckian school of evolutionary thought. This hypothesis was made effectively obsolete after the 1900 rediscovery among biologists of Gregor Mendel's theory of the particulate nature of inheritance.

== Early history ==
Pangenesis was similar to ideas put forth by Hippocrates, Democritus and other pre-Darwinian scientists in proposing that the whole of parental organisms participate in heredity (thus the prefix pan). Darwin wrote that Hippocrates' pangenesis was "almost identical with mine—merely a change of terms—and an application of them to classes of facts necessarily unknown to the old philosopher."

The historian of science Conway Zirkle wrote that:

The hypothesis of pangenesis is as old as the belief in the inheritance of acquired characters. It was endorsed by Hippocrates, Democritus, Galen, Clement of Alexandria, Lactantius, St. Isidore of Seville, Bartholomeus Anglicus, St. Albert the Great, St. Thomas of Aquinas, Peter of Crescentius, Paracelsus, Jerome Cardan, Levinus Lemnius, Venette, John Ray, Buffon, Bonnet, Maupertuis, von Haller and Herbert Spencer.

Zirkle demonstrated that the idea of inheritance of acquired characteristics had become fully accepted by the 16th century and remained immensely popular through to the time of Lamarck's work, at which point it began to draw more criticism due to lack of hard evidence. He also stated that pangenesis was the only scientific explanation ever offered for this concept, developing from Hippocrates' belief that "the semen was derived from the whole body." In the 13th century, pangenesis was commonly accepted on the principle that semen was a refined version of food unused by the body, which eventually translated to 15th and 16th century widespread use of pangenetic principles in medical literature, especially in gynecology. Later pre-Darwinian important applications of the idea included hypotheses about the origin of the differentiation of races.

A theory put forth by Pierre Louis Maupertuis in 1745 called for particles from both parents governing the attributes of the child, although some historians have called his remarks on the subject cursory and vague.

In 1749, the French naturalist Georges-Louis Leclerc, Comte de Buffon developed a hypothetical system of heredity much like Darwin's pangenesis, wherein 'organic molecules' were transferred to offspring during reproduction and stored in the body during development. Commenting on Buffon's views, Darwin stated, "If Buffon had assumed that his organic molecules had been formed by each separate unit throughout the body, his view and mine would have been very closely similar."

In 1801, Erasmus Darwin advocated a hypothesis of pangenesis in the third edition of his book Zoonomia. In 1809, Jean-Baptiste Lamarck in his Philosophie Zoologique put forth evidence for the idea that characteristics acquired during the lifetime of an organism, from either environmental or behavioural effects, may be passed on to the offspring. Charles Darwin first had significant contact with Lamarckism during his time at the University of Edinburgh Medical School in the late 1820s, both through Robert Edmond Grant, whom he assisted in research, and in Erasmus's journals. Darwin's first known writings on the topic of Lamarckian ideas as they related to inheritance are found in a notebook he opened in 1837, also entitled Zoonomia. Historian Jonathan Hodge states that the theory of pangenesis itself first appeared in Darwin's notebooks in 1841.

In 1861, the Irish physician Henry Freke developed a variant of pangenesis in his book Origin of Species by Means of Organic Affinity. Freke proposed that all life was developed from microscopic organic agents which he named granules, which existed as 'distinct species of organizing matter' and would develop into different biological structures.

Four years before the publication of Variation, in his 1864 book Principles of Biology, Herbert Spencer proposed a theory of "physiological units" similar to Darwin's gemmules, which likewise were said to be related to specific body parts and responsible for the transmission of characteristics of those body parts to offspring. He supported the Lamarckian idea of transmission of acquired characteristics.

Darwin had debated whether to publish a theory of heredity for an extended period of time due to its highly speculative nature. He decided to include pangenesis in Variation after sending a 30-page manuscript to his close friend and supporter Thomas Huxley in May 1865, which was met by significant criticism from Huxley that made Darwin even more hesitant. However, Huxley eventually advised Darwin to publish, writing: "Somebody rummaging among your papers half a century hence will find Pangenesis & say 'See this wonderful anticipation of our modern Theories—and that stupid ass, Huxley, prevented his publishing them'".

== Theory ==
=== Darwin ===
Darwin's pangenesis theory attempted to explain the process of sexual reproduction, inheritance of traits, and complex developmental phenomena such as cellular regeneration in a unified mechanistic structure. Longshan Liu wrote that in modern terms, pangenesis deals with issues of "dominance inheritance, graft hybridization, reversion, xenia, telegony, the inheritance of acquired characters, regeneration and many groups of facts pertaining to variation, inheritance and development." Mechanistically, Darwin proposed pangenesis to occur through the transfer of organic particles which he named 'gemmules.' Gemmules, which he also sometimes referred to as plastitudes, pangenes, granules, or germs, were supposed to be shed by the organs of the body and carried in the bloodstream to the reproductive organs where they accumulated in the germ cells or gametes. Their accumulation was thought to occur by some sort of a 'mutual affinity.' Each gemmule was said to be specifically related to a certain body part- as described, they did not contain information about the entire organism. The different types were assumed to be dispersed through the whole body, and capable of self-replication given 'proper nutriment'. When passed on to offspring via the reproductive process, gemmules were thought to be responsible for developing into each part of an organism and expressing characteristics inherited from both parents. Darwin thought this to occur in a literal sense: he explained cell proliferation to progress as gemmules to bind to more developed cells of their same character and mature. In this sense, the uniqueness of each individual would be due to their unique mixture of their parents' gemmules, and therefore characters. Similarity to one parent over the other could be explained by a quantitative superiority of one parent's gemmules. Yongsheng Lu points out that Darwin knew of cells' ability to multiply by self-division, so it is unclear how Darwin supposed the two proliferation mechanisms to relate to each other. He did clarify in a later statement that he had always supposed gemmules to only bind to and proliferate from developing cells, not mature ones. Darwin hypothesized that gemmules might be able to survive and multiply outside of the body in a letter to J. D. Hooker in 1870.

Some gemmules were thought to remain dormant for generations, whereas others were routinely expressed by all offspring. Every child was built up from selective expression of the mixture of the parents and grandparents' gemmules coming from either side. Darwin likened this to gardening: a flowerbed could be sprinkled with seeds "most of which soon germinate, some lie for a period dormant, whilst others perish." He did not claim gemmules were in the blood, although his theory was often interpreted in this way. Responding to Fleming Jenkin's review of On the Origin of Species, he argued that pangenesis would permit the preservation of some favourable variations in a population so that they wouldn't die out through blending.

Darwin thought that environmental effects that caused altered characteristics would lead to altered gemmules for the affected body part. The altered gemmules would then have a chance of being transferred to offspring, since they were assumed to be produced throughout an organism's life. Thus, pangenesis theory allowed for the Lamarckian idea of transmission of characteristics acquired through use and disuse. Accidental gemmule development in incorrect parts of the body could explain deformations and the 'monstrosities' Darwin cited in Variation.

=== De Vries ===
Hugo de Vries characterized his own version of pangenesis theory in his 1889 book Intracellular Pangenesis with two propositions, of which he only accepted the first:

I. In the cells there are numberless particles which differ from each other, and represent the individual cells, organs, functions and qualities of the whole individual. These particles are much larger than the chemical molecules and smaller than the smallest known organisms; yet they are for the most part comparable to the latter, because, like them, they can divide and multiply through nutrition and growth. They are transmitted, during cell-division, to the daughter-cells: this is the ordinary process of heredity.
II. In addition to this, the cells of the organism, at every stage of development, throw off such particles, which are conducted to the germ-cells and transmit to them those characters which the respective cells may have acquired during development.

=== Other variants ===
The historian of science Janet Browne points out that while Spencer and Carl von Nägeli also put forth ideas for systems of inheritance involving gemmules, their version of gemmules differed from Darwin's in that it contained "a complete microscopic blueprint for an entire creature." Spencer published his theory of "physiological units" three years prior to Darwin's publication of Variation. Browne adds that Darwin believed specifically in gemmules from each body part because they might explain how environmental effects could be passed on as characteristics to offspring.

Interpretations and applications of pangenesis continued to appear frequently in medical literature up until Weismann's experiments and subsequent publication on germ-plasm theory in 1892. For instance, an address by Huxley spurred on substantial work by Dr. James Ross in linking ideas found in Darwin's pangenesis to the germ theory of disease. Ross cites the work of both Darwin and Spencer as key to his application of pangenetic theory.

== Collapse ==
=== Galton's experiments on rabbits ===
Darwin's half-cousin Francis Galton conducted wide-ranging inquiries into heredity which led him to refute Charles Darwin's hypothetical theory of pangenesis. In consultation with Darwin, he set out to see if gemmules were transported in the blood. In a long series of experiments from 1869 to 1871, he transfused the blood between dissimilar breeds of rabbits, and examined the features of their offspring. He found no evidence of characters transmitted in the transfused blood.

Galton was troubled because he began the work in good faith, intending to prove Darwin right, and having praised pangenesis in Hereditary Genius in 1869. Cautiously, he criticized his cousin's theory, although qualifying his remarks by saying that Darwin's gemmules, which he called "pangenes", might be temporary inhabitants of the blood that his experiments had failed to pick up.

Darwin challenged the validity of Galton's experiment, giving his reasons in an article published in Nature where he wrote:

Now, in the chapter on Pangenesis in my Variation of Animals and Plants under Domestication, I have not said one word about the blood, or about any fluid proper to any circulating system. It is, indeed, obvious that the presence of gemmules in the blood can form no necessary part of my hypothesis; for I refer in illustration of it to the lowest animals, such as the Protozoa, which do not possess blood or any vessels; and I refer to plants in which the fluid, when present in the vessels, cannot be considered as true blood." He goes on to admit: "Nevertheless, when I first heard of Mr. Galton's experiments, I did not sufficiently reflect on the subject, and saw not the difficulty of believing in the presence of gemmules in the blood.

After the circulation of Galton's results, the perception of pangenesis quickly changed to severe skepticism if not outright disbelief.

=== Weismann ===
August Weismann's germ plasm theory. The hereditary material, the germ plasm, is confined to the gonads. Somatic cells (of the body) develop afresh in each generation from the germ plasm. The implied Weismann barrier between the germ line and the soma prevents Lamarckian inheritance.

August Weismann's idea, set out in his 1892 book Das Keimplasma: eine Theorie der Vererbung (The Germ Plasm: a Theory of Inheritance), was that the hereditary material, which he called the germ plasm, and the rest of the body (the soma) had a one-way relationship: the germ-plasm formed the body, but the body did not influence the germ-plasm, except indirectly in its participation in a population subject to natural selection. This distinction is commonly referred to as the Weismann Barrier. If correct, this made Darwin's pangenesis wrong and Lamarckian inheritance impossible. His experiment on mice, cutting off their tails and showing that their offspring had normal tails across multiple generations, was proposed as a proof of the non-existence of Lamarckian inheritance, although Peter Gauthier has argued that Weismann's experiment showed only that injury did not affect the germ plasm and neglected to test the effect of Lamarckian use and disuse. Weismann argued strongly and dogmatically for Darwinism and against neo-Lamarckism, polarising opinions among other scientists. This increased anti-Darwinian feeling, contributing to its eclipse.

=== After pangenesis ===
Darwin's pangenesis theory was widely criticised, in part for its Lamarckian premise that parents could pass on traits acquired in their lifetime. Conversely, the neo-Lamarckians of the time seized upon pangenesis as evidence to support their case. Italian Botanist Federico Delpino's objection that gemmules' ability to self-divide is contrary to their supposedly innate nature gained considerable traction; however, Darwin was dismissive of this criticism, remarking that the particulate agents of smallpox and scarlet fever seem to have such characteristics. Lamarckism fell from favour after August Weismann's research in the 1880s indicated that changes from use (such as lifting weights to increase muscle mass) and disuse (such as being lazy and becoming weak) were not heritable. However, some scientists continued to voice their support in spite of Galton's and Weismann's results: notably, in 1900 Karl Pearson wrote that pangenesis "is no more disproved by the statement that 'gemmules have not been found in the blood,' than the atomic theory is disproved by the fact that no atoms have been found in the air." Finally, the rediscovery of Mendel's Laws of Inheritance in 1900 led to pangenesis being fully set aside. Julian Huxley observed that the later discovery of chromosomes and the research of T. H. Morgan also made pangenesis untenable.

Some of Darwin's pangenesis principles do relate to heritable aspects of phenotypic plasticity, although the status of gemmules as a distinct class of organic particles has been firmly rejected. However, starting in the 1950s, many research groups in revisiting Galton's experiments found that heritable characteristics could indeed arise in rabbits and chickens following DNA injection or blood transfusion. This type of research originated in the Soviet Union in the late 1940s in the work of Sopikov and others, and was later corroborated by researchers in Switzerland as it was being further developed by the Soviet scientists. Notably, this work was supported in the USSR in part due to its conformation with the ideas of Trofim Lysenko, who espoused a version of neo-Lamarckism as part of Lysenkoism. Further research of this heritability of acquired characteristics developed into, in part, the modern field of epigenetics. Darwin himself had noted that "the existence of free gemmules is a gratuitous assumption"; by some accounts in modern interpretation, gemmules may be considered a prescient mix of DNA, RNA, proteins, prions, and other mobile elements that are heritable in a non-Mendelian manner at the molecular level. Liu points out that Darwin's ideas about gemmules replicating outside of the body are predictive of in vitro gene replication used, for instance, in PCR.

== See also ==
- Modern synthesis
