= Joseph Thomas Cunningham =

British marine biologist and zoologist

Joseph Thomas Cunningham (1859–1935) was a British marine biologist and zoologist known for his experiments on flatfish and his writings on neo-Lamarckism.

== Career ==
Cunningham was a graduate of Balliol College, Oxford and later became a Fellow of University College, Oxford. His career as a marine biologist started in 1883 when he became an assistant to James Cossar Ewart, the Regius Professor of Natural History at Edinburgh. A year later he was appointed director of John Murray's floating marine laboratory (the Ark) at Granton. From 1887 until 1897 he was naturalist to the Marine Biological Association of the United Kingdom, stationed at Plymouth until 1895 and then at Grimsby.

He moved in 1902 to London and became a member of the biological staff of the London Hospital Medical College. From 1917-1926 he was a lecturer at East London College and after retirement from teaching he continued to carry out research whilst based at the London Hospital Medical College. He was elected a Fellow of the Zoological Society of London (FZS) in 1903.

Cunningham was a neo-Lamarckian. In his book Hormones and Heredity (1921) he proposed that the mechanism for the inheritance of acquired characteristics were hormones. He termed this "chemical Lamarckism".

According to science historian Peter J. Bowler the idea held by Cunningham that hormones transferred from one generation to the next independent of the germ plasm was seen at the time by neo-Lamarckians as a plausible hypothesis, however "its advocates were unable to get beyond the stage of providing indirect evidence for the effect they postulated."

== Experiments ==
In a series of experiments (in 1891, 1893 and 1895) on the action of light on the coloration of flatfish, Cunningham directed light upon the lower sides of flatfishes by means of a glass-bottomed tank placed over a mirror. He discovered that light causes the production of pigments on the lower sides of flatfishes, and gave his results a Lamarckian interpretation. Other scientists interpreted his results differently. George Romanes wrote approvingly of Cunningham's interpretation, but the geneticist William Bateson was not convinced that the cause of the increase in pigmentation was from the illumination. Thomas Hunt Morgan criticized the experiments and did not believe the results were evidence for Lamarckism.

== Opposition to sexual selection ==
Cunningham challenged the concept of sexual selection. His book Sexual Dimorphism in the Animal Kingdom (1900) attempted to explain secondary sexual characters by Lamarckian principles. The chemist Raphael Meldola noted in a review for Nature that "although many of us may arrive at the conclusion that Mr. Cunningham has not succeeded in establishing his case, it will be generally admitted that he has discussed the problem, on the whole, in a more or less scientific spirit."

He translated Theodor Eimer's Die Enstehung der Arten (1888) into English.

== Publications ==
- Charles Darwin: Naturalist (1886)
- Sexual Dimorphism in the Animal Kingdom: A Theory of the Evolution of Secondary Sexual Characters (1900)
- The Preservation of Fishing Nets (1902)
- Hormones and Heredity (1921)
- Modern Biology: A Review of the Principal Phenomena of Animal Life in Relation to Modern Concepts and Theories (1928)
