= Henry Freke =

Irish physician (1813–1888)

Henry Freke (1813–1888) was an Irish physician and early evolutionary writer.

== Biography ==
Freke took a B. A. at Trinity in 1840, his M. B. in 1845 and his M.D. in 1855. He worked as a physician in various hospitals in Dublin and worked at the first Irish lunatic asylum founded by Jonathan Swift. He is credited for developing the concept of negative entropy.

== Evolution ==
His early writings in the Dublin Quarterly Journal of Medical Science experimented with evolutionary ideas such as all organisms descending from a single germ. Freke proposed an evolutionary theory in 1851 and more fully in a book for 1861.

Freke argued to have published on evolution before Charles Darwin. In 1851 he wrote a pamphlet that claimed animals and plants had evolved from a single filament. He sent a copy of the pamphlet to Darwin who described the writing style as "ill-written" and "beyond my scope". However, in the Historical Sketch which first appeared in the 3rd Edition of Darwin's On the Origin of Species (1861), Freke is listed as an early evolution proponent. On page 83 of his On the Origin of Species by Means of Organic Affinity (1861), Freke developed a theory of pangenesis, in which he proposed that all life was developed from microscopic organic agents which he named granules, which existed as 'distinct species of organizing matter' and would develop into different biological structures.

== Publications ==
- Reflections on Organization, or Suggestions for the Construction of an Organic Atomic Theory (1848)
- On the Origin of Species by Means of Organic Affinity (1861)
- An Appeal to Physiologists and the Press (1862)
