= Michael F. Guyer =

American cytologist and zoologist (1874–1959)

Michael Frederic Guyer (1874–1959) was an American cytologist and zoologist.

Guyer was professor of zoology at the University of Wisconsin. In 1902, he independently discovered Mendel's laws from the cytology of spermatogenesis in pigeon hybrids.

Between 1918 and 1924, Guyer with Elizabeth A. Smith performed experiments attempting to demonstrate Lamarckism in which fowl serum antibodies for rabbit lens-protein were injected into pregnant rabbits which resulted in defects in the eyes of some of their offspring that were inherited through eight generations. Their experiments were criticized and were not repeated by other scientists.

Guyer was an eugenicist.

== Publications ==
- Animal Micrology: Practical Exercises in Microscopical Methods (1906)
- Laboratory Outlines for Physiology (1906)
- Being Well-Born: An Introduction to Eugenics (1916)
- Animal Micrology: Practical Exercises in Zoölogical Micro-Technique (1917)
- Animal Biology (1937)
- Speaking of Man: A Biologist Looks at Man (1942)
