= William Lawrence Tower =

American zoologist (1872–1967)

William Lawrence Tower (22 December 1872– July 1967) was an American zoologist, born in Halifax, Massachusetts. He was educated at the Lawrence Scientific School (Harvard), the Harvard Graduate School, and the University of Chicago (B. S., 1902), where he taught thereafter, becoming associate professor in 1911.

== Research ==
Tower was notable for his experimental work in heredity, investigating the inheritance of acquired characteristics and the laws of heredity in beetles and publishing An Investigation of Evolution in Chrysomelid Beetles of the Genus Leptinotarsa (1906). This study is probably the first (albeit possibly discredited) of mutation in animals. He published also The Development of the Colors and Color Patterns of Coleoptera (1903) and, with Coulter, Castle, Davenport and East, an essay on Heredity and Eugenics (1912).

Tower was caught up in personal and professional scandals. He resigned from the University of Chicago in 1917 following a very public divorce, but by then he had become a source of discontent among students and faculty. His professed atheism caused offense to some, including graduate student Warder Clyde Allee. Tower caused political friction within the department and many members distrusted his professional ethics. Experimental results which Tower reported in 1906 and 1910 were found to include serious discrepancies which he declined to explain. His claim that experimental results had been lost in a fire increased his colleagues' skepticism. William Bateson, T. D. A. Cockerell, and R. A. Gortner were particularly critical of his work. A more positive reception came from the botanist Henry Chandler Cowles.

It was suggested that his research may have been faked. The geneticist William E. Castle who visited Tower's laboratory was not impressed by the experimental conditions. He later concluded that Tower had faked his data. Castle found the fire suspicious and also Tower's claim that a steam leak in his greenhouse had destroyed all his beetle stocks.

== Publications ==
- The Development of the Colors and Color Patterns of Coleoptera (1903)
- An Investigation of Evolution in Chrysomelid Beetles of the Genus Leptinotarsa (1906)
- The Mechanism of Evolution in Leptinotarsa (1918)
