= Conway Zirkle =

American botanist and historian of science (1895-1972)

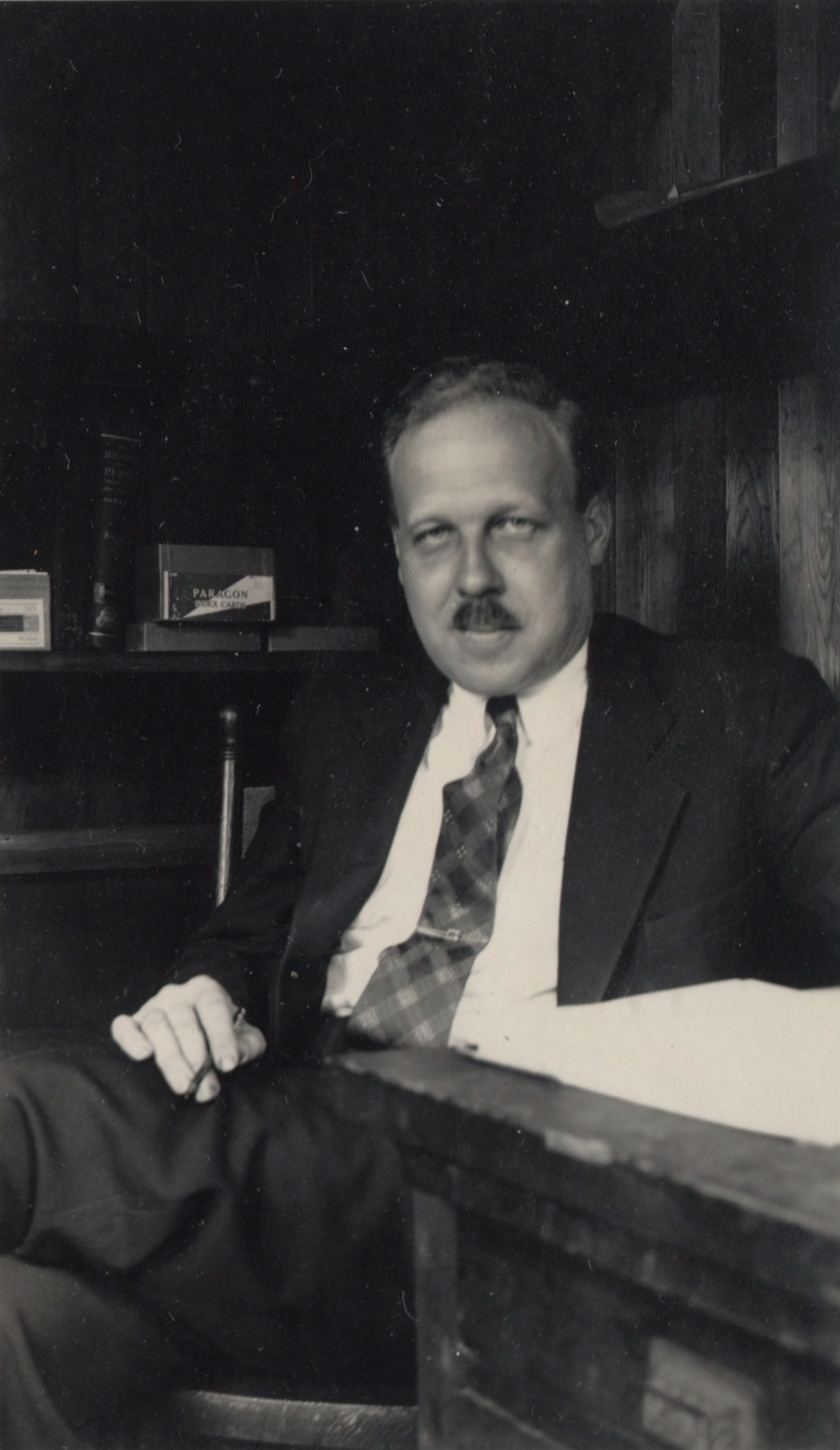
- Born: October 28, 1895
- Died: March 28, 1972 (aged 76)
- Occupation(s): Botanist, historian of science

Conway Zirkle (October 28, 1895 – March 28, 1972) was an American botanist and historian of science.

Zirkle was professor emeritus at the University of Pennsylvania. He was highly critical of Lamarckism, Lysenkoism, and Marxian biology.

== Selected publications ==
Books

- The Beginnings of Plant Hybridization (1935)
- Death of a Science in Russia, the Fate of Genetics as Described in "Pravda" and Elsewhere (1949)
- Evolution, Marxian Biology, and the Social Scene (1959)
- The Evolution of Biology (1964)

Papers

- 1935. The Inheritance of Acquired Characters and the Provisional Hypothesis of Pangenesis. American Naturalist 69: 417–445.
- 1936. Further Notes on Pangenesis and the Inheritance of Acquired Characters. American Naturalist 70: 529–546.
- 1941. Natural Selection Before the 'Origin of Species'. Proceedings of the American Philosophical Association 84: 71–123.
- 1946. The Early History of the Idea of the Inheritance of Acquired Characters and Pangenesis. Transactions of the American Philosophical Society. 335: 91–151.
- 1947. The Theory of Concentric Spheres: Edmund Halley, Cotton Mather, & John Cleves Symmes. Isis. University of Chicago Press (on behalf of The History of Science Society) 37: 155–159.
- 1952. Early Ideas on Inbreeding and Crossbreeding. In Heterosis, edited by John W. Gowen, 1–13. Iowa State College Press.
- 1958. The First Recognized Plant Hybrid. Journal of Heredity 49: 137–138.
- 1959. Species Before Darwin. Proceedings of the American Philosophical Society 103: 636–644.
- 1964. Some Oddities in the Delayed Discovery of Mendelism. Journal of Heredity 55 (2): 65–72.
