= Theodor Eimer =

German zoologist (1843–1898)

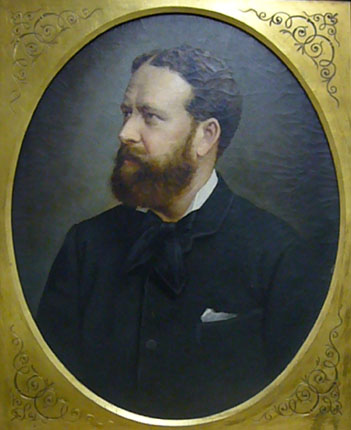
- Born: 22 February 1843; Stäfa, canton of Zürich, Switzerland
- Died: 29 May 1898 (aged 55); Tübingen, Germany
- Education: University of Tübingen, University of Freiburg, University of Würzburg (D.Phil.)
- Known for: Orthogenesis
- Spouse: Anna Lutteroth
- Mother: Albertine Pfenniger
- Scientific career
- Fields: Zoology
- Workplaces: University of Würzburg, University of Tübingen

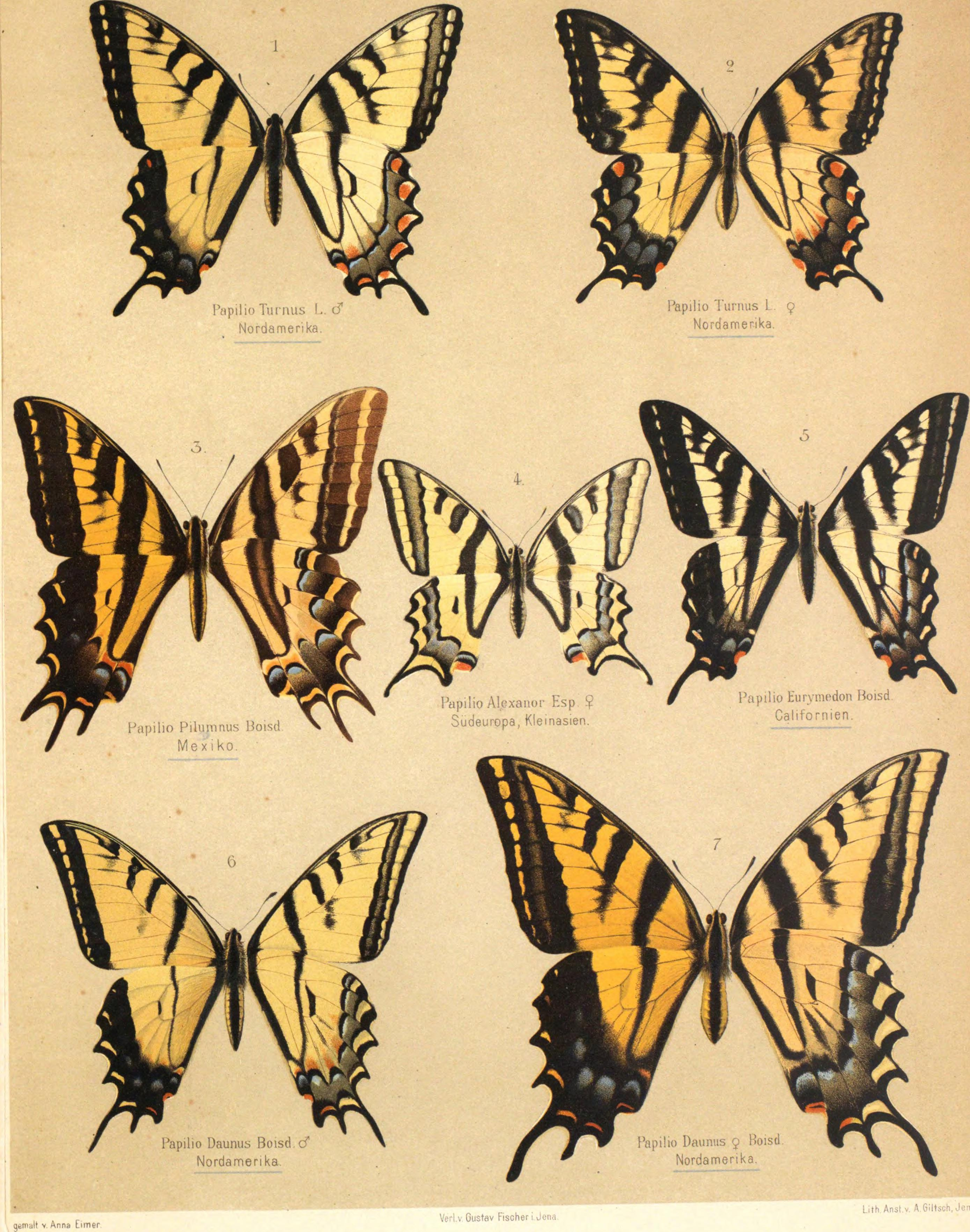
Die Artbildung und Verwandtschaft bei den Schmetterlingen.

Gustav Heinrich Theodor Eimer (22 February 1843 – 29 May 1898) was a German zoologist. He was a popularizer of orthogenesis, a form of directed evolution through mutations that made use of Lamarckian principles.

== Life and work ==
Eimer was born in Stäfa, Switzerland, where his father, who had taken refuge following an attempted coup against the German Confederation in Frankfurt in 1833, practiced medicine. Eimer's mother, Albertine Pfenniger, was Swiss. After studying at gymnasiums in Bruchsal and Freiburg where his father worked, Eimer matriculated at Tübingen, where he was influenced by Franz von Leydig. He then studied from 1863 at Freiburg, and 1864 at Heidelberg to pass examinations in natural sciences. He spent the winter semester of 1865 at the University of Tübingen and in 1866 he worked in Berlin at Rudolf Virchow’s laboratory. He obtained a medical degree in 1867 and then studied zoology at Freiburg under August Weismann followed by studies in Paris. He received a D.Phil. in Würzburg studying fat absorption in the intestine under Albert von Kölliker. After spending his junior faculty years as prosector at University of Würzburg, he became in 1875 a professor of zoology and comparative anatomy at the University of Tübingen. Eimer was one of the founders of the German Zoological Society.

On 18 July 1870 he married the artist Anna Lutteroth, daughter of a Hamburg banker. Anna would illustrate his scientific publications throughout their marriage. Eimer volunteered to serve in the army during the Siege of Strasbourg, along with his wife who served as a nurse. He however fell ill and was forced to retire and went to the island of Capri to recuperate. It was here that his early studies on orthogenesis began. Eimer made use of studies (based possibly on the suggestion of Kölliker) that he conducted on a blue variant of the Italian wall lizard (Podarcis siculus coeruleus) found on the Faraglioni Rocks off Capri. He explained that the island had little vegetation which made them blue rather than green which he claimed was closer to the colour of the rocks and therefore adaptive but he did not explicitly invoke selection as a process. In later works he strongly opposed the idea of selection as a process.

Eimer is credited with popularizing the term orthogenesis (originally introduced by Wilhelm Haacke in 1893) to describe evolution directed in specific pathways due to restrictions in the direction of variation. Though his theories gained popularity in Germany in the 1880s, his work was not widely known in the English-speaking world until 1890 when his work Die Entstehung der Arten auf Grund von Vererben erworbener Eigenschaften nach den Gesetzen organischen Waschsens (1888) was translated by Joseph Thomas Cunningham as Organic Evolution as the Result of the inheritance of Acquired Characters according to the Laws of Organic Growth. This book was predominantly a Neo-Lamarckian polemic against August Weismann, his former teacher and Neo-Darwinian. Eimer's later work, translated as On Orthogenesis, was a more rigidly orthogenetic text, whereas Organic Evolution maintained a plurality of mechanisms for species formation.

The "Eimer's organs" found in members of the mole family, especially in the star-nosed mole, are named after him. He described these organs in the European mole in 1871. Eimeria, a genus of parasitic protozoa, was also named after him.

Maria Linden became a precocious female student of Eimer's. Under Eimer's guidance she was awarded a degree and in 1895 she completed her thesis on the evolution of a snail's shell and she was awarded a doctorate in Natural Science. She worked as an assistant to Eimer until 1899.

He also studied the systematics of Papilionidae. Eimer, G. H. T. Die Artbildung und Verwandschaft bei den Schmetterlingen. Eine systematische Darstellung der Abänderungen, Abarten und Arten der Segelfalter-ähnlichen Formen der Gattung Papilio. xii + 243 pp., 4 pls., 23 figs., Gustav Fischer, Jena, 1889 was published posthumously from 1889.

Eimer died in Tübingen from an intestinal problem.
