= Paul Wintrebert =

French embryologist

- Born: 28 July 1867; Lille
- Died: 3 May 1966 (aged 98)
- Occupation: Zoologist, medical doctor, university teacher
- Awards: Chevalier of the Legion of Honour; Officer of the Legion of Honor; Serres prize (1935)
- Position held: vice president (1930–)

Paul Wintrebert (1867–1966) was a French embryologist and a theoretician of developmental biology.

He coined the term cytoskeleton (cytosquelette) in 1931.

He held radical epigenetic views. In his 60s, he published a trilogy in which he describes his position on life process and living being: Le vivant créateur de son évolution (The living being is the creator of his own evolution) (1962), Le développement du vivant par lui-même (The self-development of the living being) (1963), and L'existence délivrée de l'existentialisme (Existence delivered from existentialism) (1965).

He was a critic of the mutationist theory of evolution. His views have been described as a "biochemical Lamarckism".
