= Jan-Andrew Henderson =

Scottish author (born 1962)

Jan Andrew Henderson
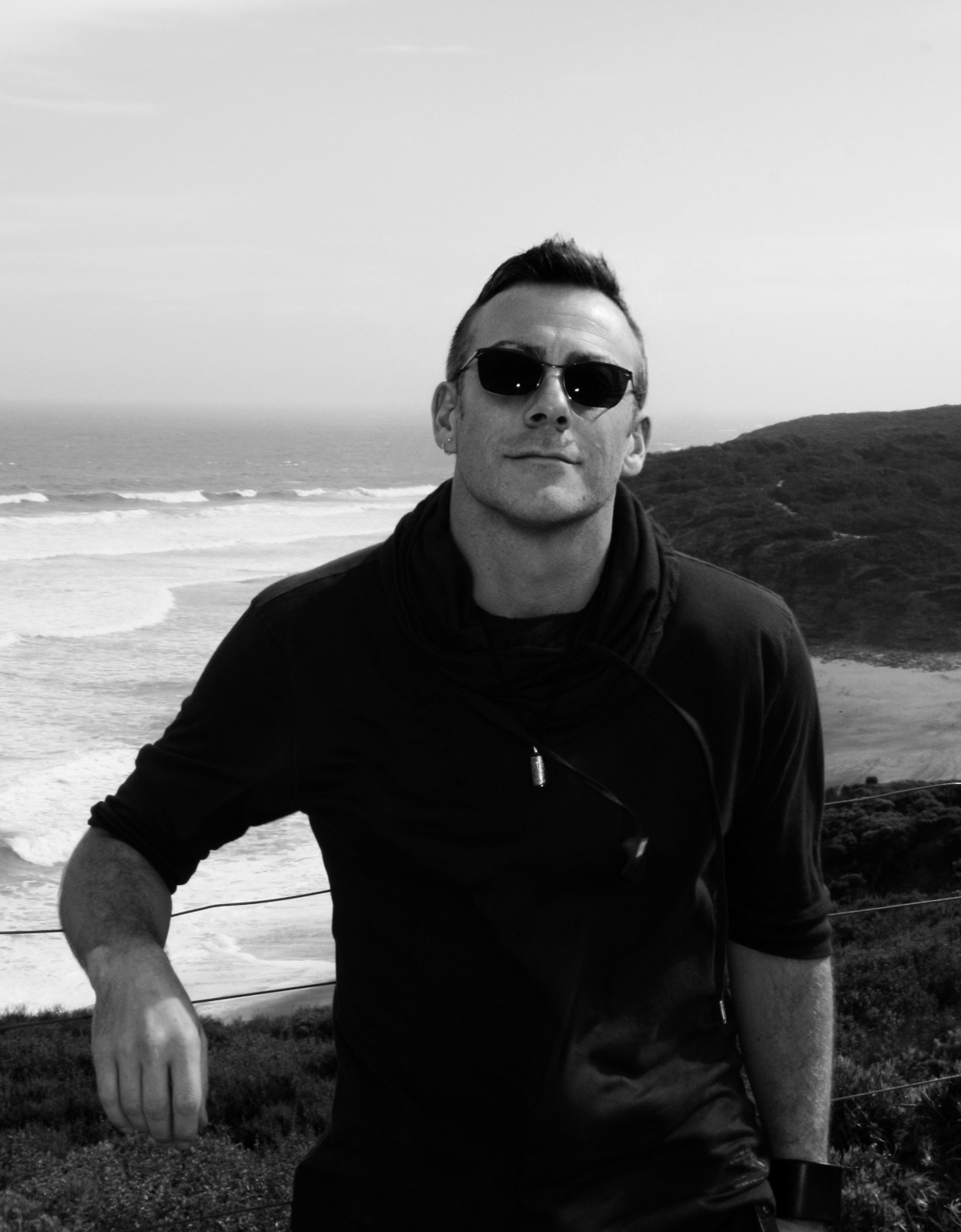
- Education: Napier University; University of Edinburgh
- Occupation: Author
- Writing career
- Years active: 1999–present
- Genre: Adult fiction
- Website: janandrewhenderson.com

Jan-Andrew Henderson is a Scottish author of children's, teen, young adult and adult fiction and non-fiction. He has published 40 books in the UK, US, Canada, Australia, and Europe. He also writes under the name J A Henderson.

He has received the Doncaster Book Prize, the Aurealis Award, and the Royal Mail Award.

== Early life and education ==
Henderson completed journalism studies at Napier University, then gained an MA Honours degree in English literature and Philosophy at the University of Edinburgh.

== Professional career ==
Henderson's career has close ties to the history of Edinburgh and its supernatural aspects. His debut book The Town Below The Ground was the first written about Edinburgh's forgotten ‘Underground City’ and helped popularise it as a major historical attraction.

His other book include The Ghost That Haunted Itself made the Mackenzie Poltergeist in Greyfriars Graveyard famous. Further works, City of the Dead and Father Figure played a significant role in shaping Edinburgh's supernatural reputation.

In 1999 Henderson founded Black Hart Entertainment and City of the Dead Tours – a ghost walk company exploring both the underground city and the Mackenzie Poltergeist.

He is a member of the Institute of Professional Editors, in 2017, he founded Green Light Literary Consultants. Other roles include an industry assessor and mentor for the Queensland Writers Centre, a peer assessor for the Australian Government, a mentor for the Horror Writers Association, secretary for the Romance Writers of Australia, an ambassador for Australia Reads, convenor for the Aurealis Award and a judge.

=== Awards and recognition ===
Henderson's novels have been shortlisted for sixteen literary awards and he is the winner of the Doncaster Book Award and the Royal Mail Award, Britain's biggest children's book prize at the time. He was also part of the Aurealis Award-winning anthology Relics Wrecks and Ruins, alongside renowned writers such as Neil Gaiman and Robert Silverberg.

== Bibliography ==
=== Non-fiction works ===
- The Town Below The Ground (Mainstream Publishers 1999)
- The Emperor's New Kilt (Mainstream Publishers 2000)
- The Ghost That Haunted Itself (Mainstream Publishers 2001)
- Who Wants to be an Edinburger? (Black White 2004)
- The Wee Book of Edinburgh (Black White 2004)
- Edinburgh: City of the Dead (Black White 2010)
- Black Markers (Amberley Press 2015)
- The Royal Mile (Amberley Press 2017)
- Edinburgh New Town (Amberley Press 2018)
- Edinburgh's Underground City (Black Hart 2021)
- Edinburgh's Literary Heritage and How It Changed the World (Amberley Press 2021)
- My Royal Mile Adventure (Black Hart 2021)
- Going Underground (Amberley Press 2022)
- ‘That is SO Wrong!’ ‘That is TOO Wrong and ‘That is ALL Wrong’ short story trilogy. Editor and main contributor (Black Hart 2022)
- Let's Write a Page Turner! (Black Hart 2023)
- Aftonhouse (Three Ravens 2025)

=== Fiction works ===
- Secret City (Oxford University Press 2004)
- Colony (Oxford University Press 2009)
- Storm Chasers (Oxford University Press Project X series 2009)
- Swing (Oxford University Press 2009)
- The Beasts of Blackwater (Oxford University Press Project X Series 2015)
- The 9th Battalion (Oxford University Press Project X Series 2015)
- The Fear Machine (Oxford University Press Project X Series 2015)
- Time Trip (Oxford University Press Project X Series 2015)
- Time Runs Out (Oxford University Press Project X Series 2016)
- Henry V (Collins Big Cat 2017)
- It's Only The End of the World (Floris Books 2018)
- Waiting for a Train That Never Comes (2019)
- Hide (Black Hart 2019)
- Goners (Black Hart 2019)
- Burnt Out (Black Hart 2019)
- Bunker 10 (2019)
- Hunting Charlie Wilson (Oxford University Press 2020)
- I Don't Really Get Jan-Andrew Henderson (Black Hart 2020)
- Carnage (Black Hart 2020)
- A Town Called Library (Black Hart 2020)
- Father Figure (Black Hart 2020)
- The Knight With 1,000 Eyes (Black Hart 2021)
- Galhadria (Black Hart 2022)
- The Armageddon Twins (2022)
- Aftonhouse (3 Ravens Press 2024)

== Personal life ==
Henderson was born Andrew Henderson in Dundee, Scotland in 1962. He grew up in Kirriemuir before moving to Edinburgh and, in 2017, he relocated to Australia. Henderson is the father of three children, Charlie, Harper and Scarlet.
