= What Darwin Got Wrong =

2010 book by Jerry Fodor and Massimo Piattelli-Palmarini

- Cover of the first edition
- Authors: Jerry Fodor; Massimo Piattelli-Palmarini
- Language: English
- Subject: Evolution
- Publisher: Farrar, Straus and Giroux
- Publication date: February 16, 2010
- Publication place: United States
- Media type: Print (Hardcover and Paperback)
- Pages: 288
- ISBN: 0-374-28879-8

What Darwin Got Wrong is a 2010 book by philosopher Jerry Fodor and cognitive scientist Massimo Piattelli-Palmarini, in which the authors criticize Charles Darwin's theory of natural selection. It is an extension of an argument first presented as "Why Pigs Don't Have Wings" in the London Review of Books.

== Background ==
Fodor published an article, entitled "Why Pigs Don't Have Wings", in the London Review of Books in October 2007. It stated that "In fact, an appreciable number of perfectly reasonable biologists are coming to think that the theory of natural selection can no longer be taken for granted."

In support of this proposed disestablishment of natural selection, the article stated two arguments:

- Conceptually, it argued that the theory of natural selection contains an equivocation, as to whether selection acts upon individuals or on traits, and that to juxtapose both "depends on whether adaptationism is able to provide the required notion of ‘selection for’", and that adaptionism fails to meet this burden. Fodor credits the work of Stephen J. Gould and Richard Lewontin (who would later go on to review the resulting book) on spandrels as being the first to notice this problem. Fodor concludes that:

The crucial test is whether one’s pet theory can distinguish between selection for trait A and selection for trait B when A and B are coextensive: were polar bears selected for being white or for matching their environment? Search me; and search any kind of adaptationism I’ve heard of. Nor am I holding my breath till one comes along.

Fodor suggested that there is also an "empirical issue" involving phenotypic "free-riders"(the evolutionary byproducts that Gould and Lewontin developed the 'spandrel' metaphor for). Fodor suggests that "serious alternatives to adaptationism have begun to emerge", and offers evolutionary developmental theory ('evo-devo') as one such alternative.

The London Review of Books published eleven letters (including two from Fodor himself) over the following three months. They included negative responses from Simon Blackburn, Tim Lewens, Jerry Coyne and Philip Kitcher, and Daniel Dennett and a mixed response from Steven Rose.

Coyne and Kitcher dispute Fodor's "striking claim that evolutionary biologists are abandoning natural selection as the principal, or even an important, cause of evolutionary change" and state that "[t]his is news to us, and, we believe, will be news to most knowledgeable people as well." They go on to criticise his conceptual and empirical issues, and state that "[t]he rival mechanisms Fodor cites are supplements to natural selection, not replacements", and that "Evo-devo is not an alternative to adaptation; rather, it is a way to explain how the genes mechanistically produce adaptations." Evolutionary developmental biologist PZ Myers has expressed a similar criticism of this characterisation of evolutionary developmental biology.

Dennett states that Fodor's discussion of Gould and Lewontin’s spandrel argument misrepresents that argument, stating "that far from suggesting an alternative to adaptationism, the very concept of a spandrel depends on there being adaptations".

Blackburn writes that "His problem is fortunately quite easily solved [...] Two traits may be found together in nature, but one can play a causal role in producing a reproductive advantage, when the other does not." We can thus know that the trait that gives the advantage is the one being selected. Fodor replies that the problem is not merely about our knowledge of what is being selected, but the process of selection itself: "how can the operation of selection distinguish traits that are coextensive in a creature's ecology?" Blackburn writes back that Fodor's question is irrelevant to the process of natural selection as actually formulated by biologists, viz. organisms with genes that enhance reproductive success are more likely to pass on genes to the next generation, and so the frequency of those genes increases. "Is this incoherent? Nothing Fodor says bears on that question." Fodor replies that the picture sketched by Blackburn is incomplete. Once the picture is made complete by adding in "the Darwin bit" - "that the white bears were selected ‘because of’ their improved camouflage, and that the white bears were ‘selected for’ their improved camouflage: i.e. that the improved camouflage ‘explains’ why the white bears survived and flourished," then the incoherence is clear. Fodor claims that the theory of natural selection does not entail the aforementioned selection-for explanation. "What’s ‘incoherent’ is to admit that the theory of natural selection can’t distinguish among locally coextensive properties while continuing to claim that natural selection explains why polar bears are white."

== Summary ==
The book is divided into two parts. Part One is a review of "new facts and new non-selectional mechanisms that have been discovered in biology". Part Two is a discussion of "the logical and conceptual bases of the theory of natural selection". At the outset, the authors state their atheism and commitment to naturalistic explanations, and add that they accept evolution and common descent, but doubt that evolution proceeds by natural selection.

=== The problem of "selection-for" ===
The authors' central argument against the concept of natural selection is what they call "the problem of selection-for". An extension of Gould and Lewontin's concept of spandrels, the authors note that certain traits of organisms always come together. The authors give examples:

1. A heart both pumps blood and makes heart-like noises
2. A frog both snaps at flies and snaps at ambient black nuisances
3. A polar bear is both white and camouflaged against its environment

Because these traits come together, they are both correlated with fitness. Because exogenous selection processes posited by the theory of natural selection only have access to correlation, therefore, Fodor and Piattelli-Palmarini argue that the theory of natural selection "cannot predict/explain what traits the creatures in a population are selected-for", and so "the claim that selection is the mechanism of evolution cannot be true".

Another way the authors put the same point is as follows: If the mechanism of natural selection (as it is currently formulated) is correct, then it is a paradigm example of intensional causation. Intensional causation requires either (1) there be a mind involved in the causal process, or (2) the causal mechanism has access to nomological laws. Since there is neither (1) nor (2) at the biological level, the theory of natural selection cannot be correct.

In a response, published by the London Review of Books in November 2007, to "Why Pigs Don't Have Wings", Tim Lewens states that Elliott Sober gave the following solution to the problem of appealing to metaphors such as "Mother Nature" in 1984:

“Selection of” pertains to the effects of a selection process, whereas “selection for” describes its causes. To say there is selection for a given property means that having the property causes success in survival and reproduction.

Lewens continues:

If a property doesn’t cause success in survival and reproduction, but is linked to one that does, then there is no selection for that property. This is precisely why Fodor thinks that although there is selection of curly tails, there is no selection for curly tails.

Elliott Sober argues against Fodor with an analogy: imagine a toy tube that contained several balls of different colour and size, with the two traits as locally coextensive; balls of the same color have the same size and balls of the same size have the same color. The toy had disks in it with different sized holes, though each disk had the same hole, at different points in the tube. Thus the toy could "sort" the balls by holding it one way, as the smallest balls would fall through the bottom while the largest would remain stuck at the top, while when held the other way, all balls would fall to the bottom. Sober argues that while ball size and color are coextensive, it is clear that the selection-for is for the size, not the color. Fodor and Piatelli-Palmarini reject this, arguing that given the toy's endogenous structure the requisite intensionality is present, but there is no comparable story to be told with exogenous selectors posited by the theory of natural selection. They continue:

Sober's sieve shows us how to draw the select/select-for distinction when the mechanism that mediates the selection is specified. That being so, it tells us nothing about how to draw it within the framework of adaptionist assumptions."

Fodor also points out:

What grounds the counterfactuals in Sober’s example is the structure of the mechanism; given how it works, it lets the round pebbles through but no others; one’s intuitions about which trait is selected for follow not from what laws of selection per from mechanics. Notice, for example, that whereas competition plays a central role in the explanation of every bona fide Darwinian selection, it plays no role at all in explaining how Sober’s machine sorts for round marbles. Sober’s machine would work exactly the same way even if there were only one marble for it to sort.

Sober argues that this does not matter, since the balls are being selected for their size rather than color despite the two being coextensive. Thus, Sober argues that it is possible to determine which of two coextensive traits are being selected for.

Steven Harnad observes that Fodor makes the distinction between artificial and natural selection, arguing that the former has a mind while the latter does not, so they are not comparable. However, Harnad argues this is a false dichotomy, as in artificial selection it is still the case that certain traits are increasing reproductive success (as the breeder breeds animals for those traits) and thus being selected for, it is just humans who are "culling" those "maladaptive" traits, rather than, for example, hungry predators, making artificial selection just a special case of the same, general, mindless process of natural selection - the transmission success of heritable traits being determined by the causal contingencies of the environment in which they occur. Fodor's position on this is that the breeder who, on this picture, makes up the mechanism of selection, has a mind which necessarily supplies the required intensional causal explanation; is sensitive to the relevant counterfactuals. However, without a breeder with mental states natural selection loses the power to support the relevant counterfactuals. Robert Richards argues that the presence of a mind is irrelevant, as for Darwin a breeder was just another type of environmental condition. Richards also suggests that the presence of intentionality does not matter, as, for example, anti-biotic resistant bacteria proliferate due to excess use of antibiotics in hospitals or farms, despite the fact that hospital workers and farmers do not intend to select for greater anti-biotic resistance but their actual intentions still play a causal role. The concept of "select-for" is intentional but this is because it reflects biologists' judgements about the causally relevant aspects of particular traits in a given environment.

== Reception ==
Fodor and Piattelli-Palmarini published a short summary of their book in New Scientist.

The philosopher Mary Midgley wrote that What Darwin Got Wrong "strikes an outsider as an overdue and valuable onslaught on neo-Darwinist simplicities". The journalist Oliver Burkeman wrote an article entitled "Why everything you've been told about evolution is wrong" in The Guardian but concludes "It would be jaw-droppingly surprising, to say the least, were Fodor to be right. A safer, if mealy-mouthed, conclusion to draw is that his work acts as an important warning to those of us who think we understand natural selection".

The book received positive blurbs from linguists Noam Chomsky and Norbert Hornstein, professor of evolutionary genetics Gabriel Dover, and professor of cell biology and anatomy Stuart Newman. Philip Ball reviewed the work sympathetically for The Sunday Times.

Michael Ruse, Philip Kitcher and Ned Block, and Massimo Pigliucci are amongst the philosophers who have written reviews critical of the work.

Pigliucci criticises the first part of the book for claiming that 'Darwinism' "put[s] far too much emphasis on external causes of biological change, namely natural selection, and has ignored internal mechanisms", whilst failing to acknowledge that biology has long addressed such internal mechanisms, with Darwin himself "explicitly referring his readers to ‘the laws of correlation of growth’ – that is, to the fact that the internal structure of living organisms imposes limits and direction to evolution". He criticises the second part of the book for raising correlated traits as a new issue when "Biologists have long known about the problem" and have dealt with it:

This is why hypotheses about natural selection are usually tested by means of functional analyses rooted in physiology, genetics and developmental biology, and why observations of selection in the field are whenever possible coupled with manipulative experiments that make it possible to distinguish between, say, flies and 'dark spots moving in front of your tongue' kinds of objects.

Pigliucci observes that the authors argue "how on earth could natural selection be specifically for capturing flies? How can biologists exclude the counterfactual possibility that frogs evolved to catch dark spots dancing in front of them which happen to resemble flies, instead of catching flies per se?” However Pigliucci argues that biologists determine which traits are being selected for via functional analyses rooted in biology, physiology and development biology, along with observational evidence. Furthermore, Pigliucci argues that Fodor and Piatelli-Palmarini's discussion of the intensionality problem is easily solved by distinguishing between select of and select for:

In the case of the frogs, we can say that there is selection for capturing flies, but as a byproduct, there is also selection of the propensity to catch whatever small dark objects come within the frog’s field of view which look sufficiently like flies. Incidentally, this difference is why, contrary to popular belief, natural selection is not an optimizing process – why it makes mistakes and is inefficient, yielding whatever outcome is good enough for survival and reproduction.

In a rejoinder to the authors, Kitcher and Block argued that the authors were demanding a form of mechanism that would distinguish between adaptive traits and those correlated with it, yet this is a standard that no one else had ever required in evolutionary thinking. Kitcher and Block argue that the distinction between adaptive traits and free-riders is done by causation itself; in the case of coloured moths, a dark colour promotes reproductive success, with no further mechanism required to explain this. Block and Kitcher suggest that the authors mistakenly believe that there can be no "theory" of natural selection without this supposed mechanism, yet in the view of Block and Kitcher, no-one ever believed such a mechanism existed and thus this argument is irrelevant since scientists are able to determine how traits contribute to reproductive success in organisms (which is what natural selection is all about) regardless of whether or not a "theory" exists in the sense that Fodor and Piatelli-Palmarini understand it.

In a talk delivered at the University of California Santa Barbara, Fodor responds to Kitcher and Block's argument that the distinction between adaptive traits and free-riders is done by causation itself. Fodor suggests that such a position is "crazy" and offers an analogy regarding phone-ringers to demonstrate the problem with Kitcher and Block's position. Incoming calls cause the ringer on a phone to ring. Fodor suggests that, if Kitcher and Block are correct, then this would work because if incoming calls didn't cause the ringer to ring, then the ringer wouldn't be a ringer. Being a "ringer" and being "caused to ring by incoming calls" are inter-defined. Therefore, there doesn't need to be a mechanism that causes the ringer to ring in response to incoming calls - the job is done "by causation itself." Fodor suggests that this position is simply untenable because although it is true that a ringer is something that rings for incoming calls, it doesn't follow that there doesn't need to be a theory, mechanism, or explanation that describes how it is that some thing that is sensitive to an incoming call is also a cause of ringing.

Ruse makes the following suggestion for the motivation for the book:

At the beginning of their book, they proudly claim to be atheists. Perhaps so. But my suspicion is that, like those scorned Christians, Fodor and Piattelli-Palmarini just cannot stomach the idea that humans might just be organisms, no better than the rest of the living world. We have to be special, superior to other denizens of Planet Earth. Christians are open in their beliefs that humans are special and explaining them lies beyond the scope of science. I just wish that our authors were a little more open that this is their view too.

The evolutionary biologist Jerry Coyne describes this book as "a profoundly misguided critique of natural selection" and "as biologically uninformed as it is strident". Coyne argued that while Fodor and Piatelli-Palmarini may claim that there is no way to tell whether a trait was selected for or was merely a correlate, in reality biologists have different ways of determining which is the case. Coyne further gives the famous peppered moth as a classic example of biologists being able to conduct tests and studies to confirm it was the moth's colour that was the trait being selected.

The authors respond that the position Coyne ascribes to them is "preposterous", stating that they do not endorse the view that when traits are coextensive, there is no way to tell which of them is a cause of fitness, or that science cannot determine which trait is selected for and which is merely correlated. Fodor argues that while he has often been accused of believing that there is no fact of the matter about the causes of fitness or that determining the cause of fitness is epistemologically inaccessible, he does not believe either of these things and that his argument would be useless if he did, as his criticism of natural selection is that it does not provide a mechanism to allow one to determine the cause of fitness, which only makes sense if there was a difference between fitness and non-fitness producing traits and if knowledge of such a thing was epistemologically accessible to humans. The authors thus argue that their issue with the theory of natural selection is that while there is a fact of the matter about what traits are selected for and that such facts are accessible via empirical inquiry, they maintain that the theory of natural selection does not offer a means by which to determine these facts. In a discussion with Sober, Fodor argued that he and Piattelli-Palmarini accept that there is a matter of fact about what is selected for (for example, he agrees that it is the heart's pumping of blood rather than its making thumping noises that increases an organism's relative fitness) rather they deny that the theory of natural selection is capable of demonstrating which traits are selected for; Fodor argued that the theory of natural selection is not generating these explanations but rather it is ancillary theories doing this, as the theory of natural selection does not specify which traits will be selected for, rather these are provided by other theories such as experimental biology and accumulated knowledge about how the natural world functions.

In a review in Science Douglas J. Futuyma concluded:

Because they are prominent in their own fields, some readers may suppose that they are authorities on evolution who have written a profound and important book. They aren't, and it isn't.

Peter Godfrey-Smith also reviewed the book negatively, arguing that the authors, while criticising the idea that natural selection was an agent, seemed to be making the same mistake; Godfrey-Smith argues that the authors demand to know how natural selection can distinguish between traits if it has no agency (hence their demand for laws), despite the fact that if a trait is causing reproductive success, then it is being selected for. Thus Godfrey-Smith argues there is no need for laws because selection-for is determined by contribution to reproductive success. Furthermore, experimental evidence can determine whether or not a trait contributes to reproductive success or if it is merely a free-rider.

In response to Godfrey-Smith's criticism, the authors suggest that he has reduced the theory of natural selection to a definitional truth when it is supposed to be an explanatory theory. The authors offer the following reply:

The theory of natural selection claims that a trait's having been selected for causing reproductive success explains why a creature has it. But then it can't also claim that 'in a sense that matters' 'a trait was selected for' means that it is a cause of reproductive success. For, if it did mean that, then the theory of natural selection would reduce to a trait's being a cause of reproductive success explains its being a cause of reproductive success which explains nothing (and isn't true)....Psychologists who hoped to defend the 'law of effect' by saying that it is true by definition, that reinforcement alters response strength, made much the same mistake that Godfrey-Smith does.

Evan Thompson points out that the empirical argument in the book does not complement the conceptual argument in the book. He points out that Fodor and Piattelli-Palmarini suggest that natural selection plays a minor role in evolution (in their words “We think of natural selection as tuning the piano, not as composing the melodies”); they also believe that natural selection is impossible. Thompson argues that it makes no sense for Fodor and Piattelli-Palmarini to argue that other causal factors are more important in evolution than natural selection if they also believe that natural selection is impossible for logical or conceptual reasons.

Adam Rutherford also reviewed the book negatively in The Guardian. As did John Dupré, for The Philosopher's Magazine, David Papineau for Prospect, and Kenan Malik for the Literary Review.

== See also ==
- Beyond Natural Selection
- Darwinian Fairytales
