= Bustle =

Women's undergarment

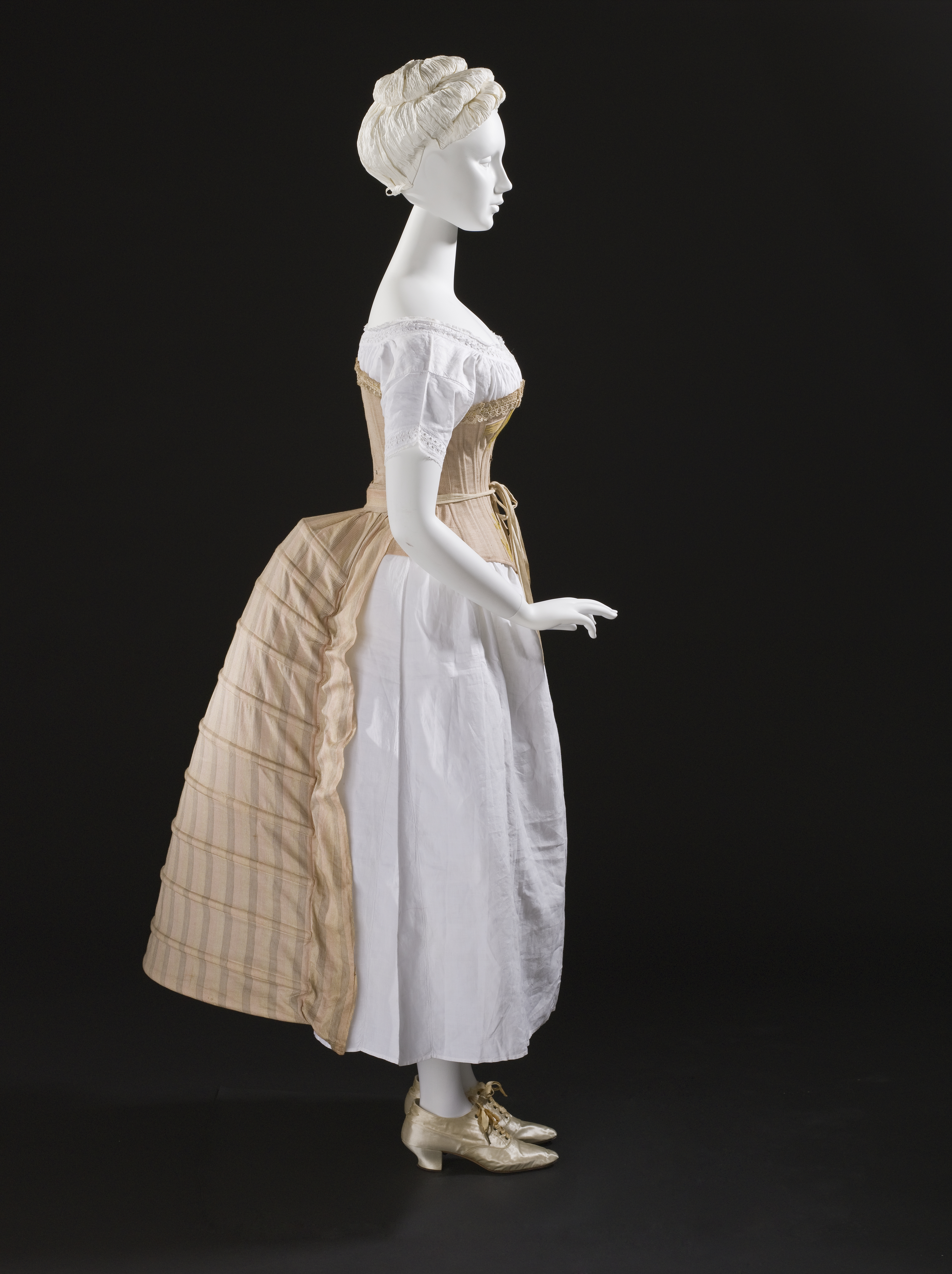
Bustle, lady's undergarment, England, c. 1885. Los Angeles County Museum of Art M.2007.211.399

A bustle is a padded undergarment or wire frame used to add fullness, or support the drapery, at the back of women's dresses in the mid-to-late 19th century. Bustles are worn under the skirt in the back, just below the waist, to keep the skirt from dragging. Heavy fabric tended to pull the back of a skirt down and flatten it. As a result, a woman's petticoated skirt would lose its shape during everyday wear (from merely sitting down or moving about).

== Origin ==
Women throughout history have used various methods to shape their skirts to accentuate the back of the hips. Padded cushions, historically called "bum rolls", "bearers", and "cork rumps", were among the many methods popular in Europe. They enjoyed sporadic popularity starting in the 16th century and were especially popular in France in the late 18th century. The crinoline was a type of integrated padded petticoat that developed from this technology. The more elaborate and specialized bustle eventually replaced the crinoline. While the wireframe bustle was popular only very briefly, simpler padded cushions returned after the bustle went out of fashion, and bustles may still be seen in wedding dresses.

While feminist scholars such as Anne Fausto-Sterling have attempted to link the popularity of the bustle to Sarah Baartman, the use of padded cushions, panniers, farthingales, and petticoats to accentuate the general shape of the buttocks or hips were already well-established in Europe in the 16th century, long before Baartman. Baartman, a Khoikhoi woman from South Africa, was featured as a circus attraction in Europe in the early 1800s, due to her steatopygic body type.

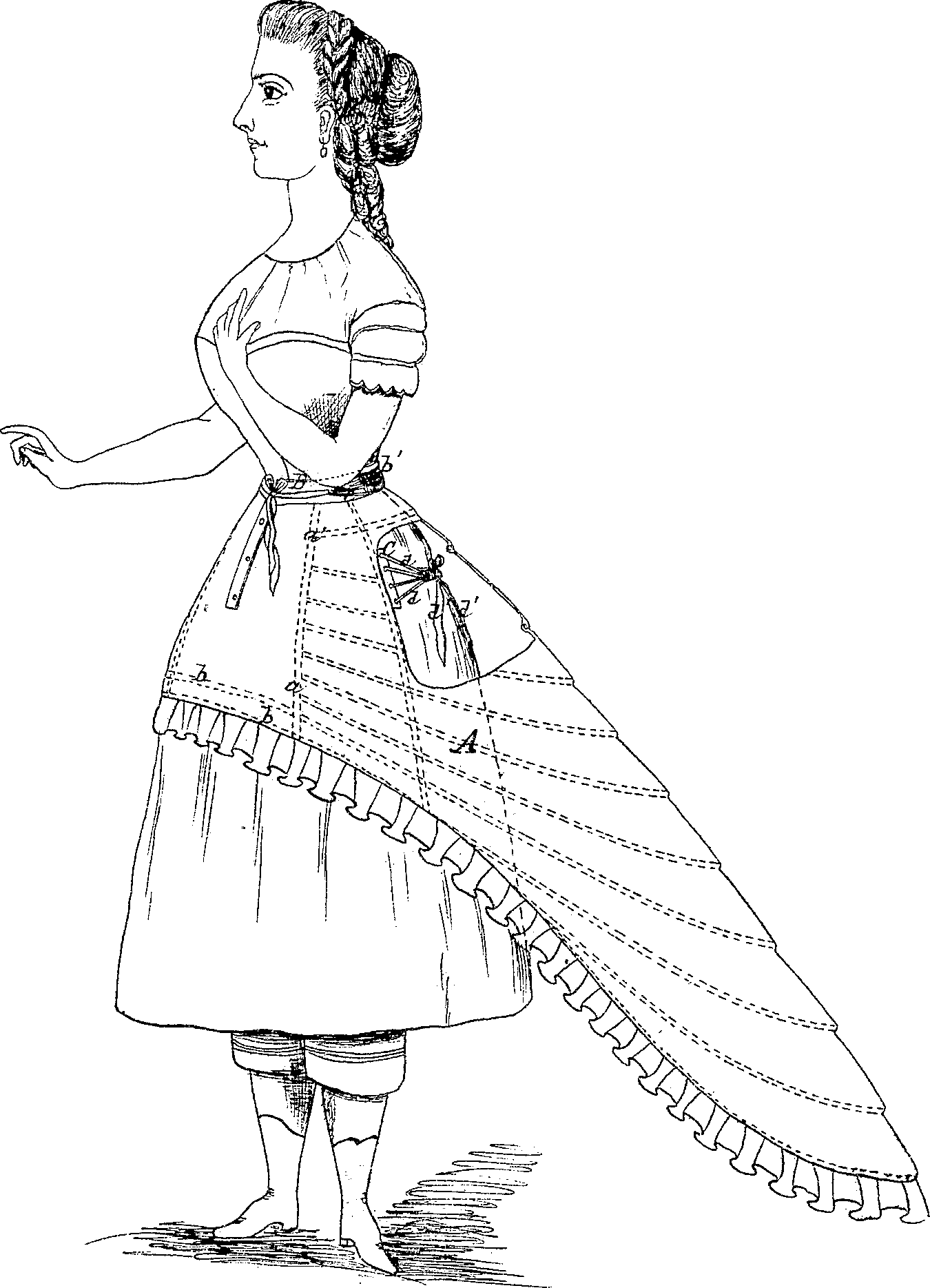
A US patent illustration of a concept crinoline/bustle. 1867

== History ==
In the early stages of the fashion for the bustle, the fullness to the back of the skirts was carried quite low and often fanned out to create a train. The transition from the voluminous crinoline-enhanced skirts of the 1850s and 1860s can be seen in the loops and gathers of fabric and trimmings worn during this period. The bustle later evolved into a much more pronounced humped shape on the back of the skirt immediately below the waist, with the fabric of the skirts falling quite sharply to the floor, changing the shape of the silhouette.

=== Transition from crinoline (1863–1872) ===
As the fashion for crinolines wore on, their shape changed. Instead of the large bell-like silhouette previously in vogue, they began to flatten out at the front and sides, creating more fullness at the back of the skirts. This style was known as the "train". One type of crinoline, the crinolette, created a shape very similar to the one produced by a bustle. Crinolettes were more restrictive than traditional crinolines, as the flat front and bulk created around the posterior made sitting down more difficult for the wearer. The excess skirt fabric created by this alteration in shape was looped around to the back, again creating increased fullness.

=== Early bustle (1869–1876) ===
The bustle later developed into a feature of fashion on its own after the overskirt of the late 1860s was draped up toward the back and some kind of support was needed for the new draped shape. Fullness of some sort was still considered necessary to make the waist look smaller and the bustle eventually replaced the crinoline completely. The bustle was worn in different shapes for most of the 1870s and 1880s.

=== Late bustle (1881–1889) ===
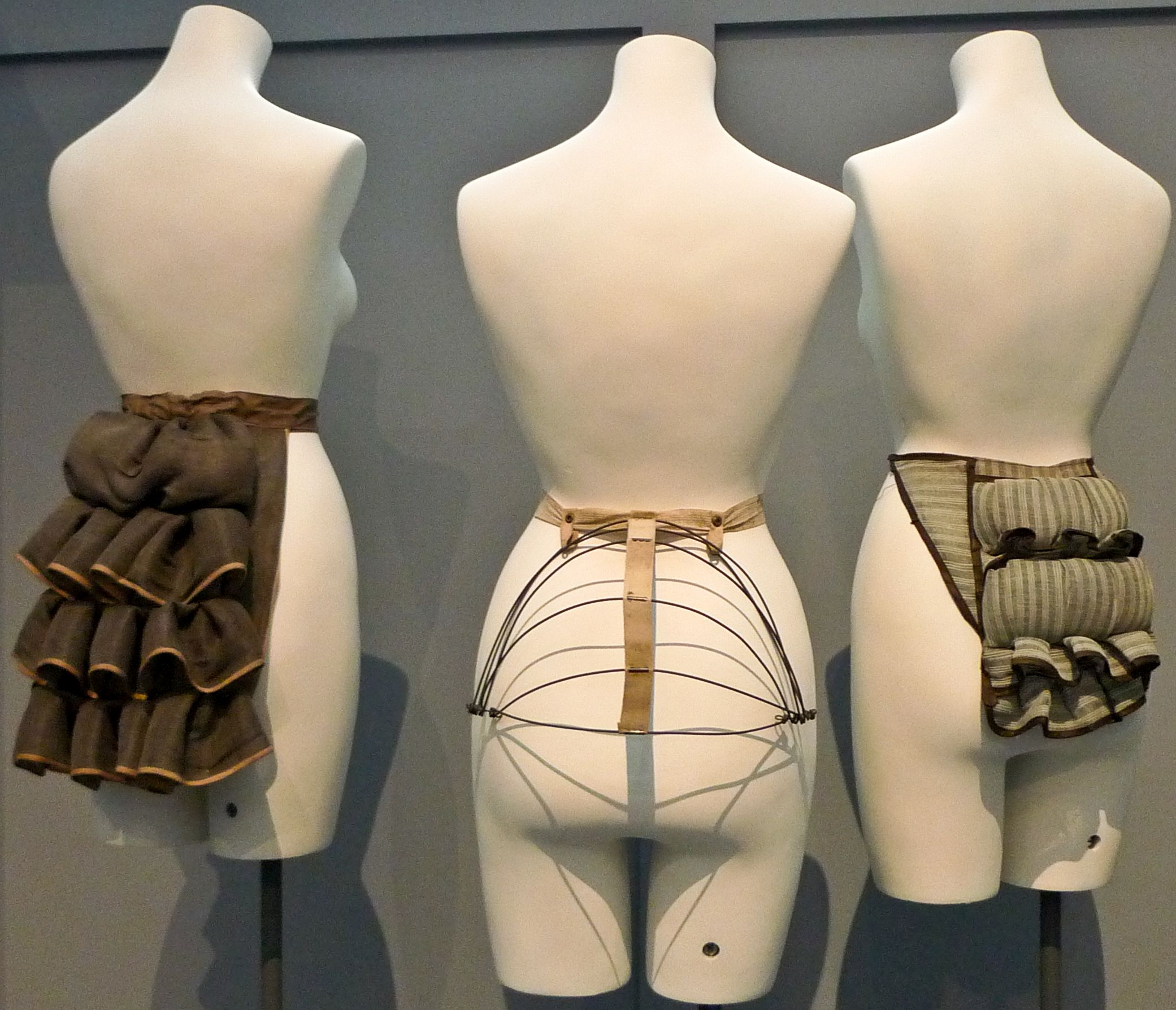
English bustle supports worn as undergarments, from 1875 to 1885.

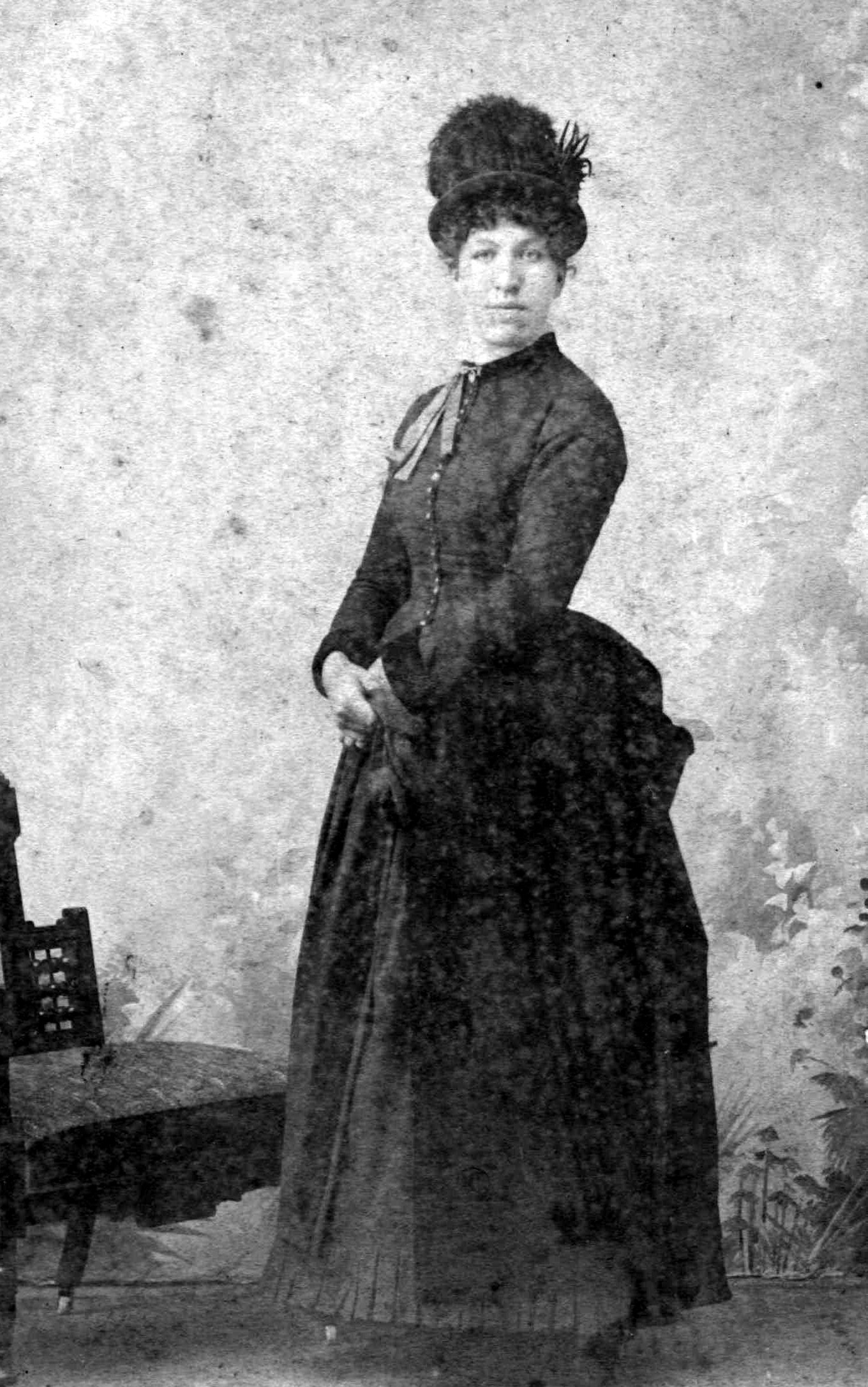
Woman wearing a dress with a bustle, US, about mid-1880s

A new bustle appeared in late 1881, and was exaggerated to become a major fashion feature in the mid and late 1880s, in 1885 reaching preposterous proportions to modern eyes, as used in the play Arms and the Man by George Bernard Shaw. The fashion for large bustles ended in 1889.

=== 1889–1913 ===
The bustle survived into the 1890s and early 20th century, as a skirt support was still needed and the curve the bustle provided on the back of the body emphasized the hips. The bustle had completely disappeared by 1905, as the long corset of the early 20th century was now successful in shaping the body to protrude behind. The bustle was also abandoned by some women for more practical dress to be able to use the newly invented bicycle.

=== Contemporary fashion ===
Bustles and bustle gowns are rarely worn in contemporary society. Notable exceptions survive in the realms of haute couture and bridal fashion, in addition to dedicated Neo-Victorian aesthetic circles including the steampunk, Gothic, and Lolita subcultures. Bustles are also employed as part of period costuming in film and theatre: an example would be the 1992 film Bram Stoker's Dracula, for which costume designer Eiko Ishioka won an Academy Award. The film features several extravagant bustle gowns created for female leads Winona Ryder and Sadie Frost.

== Other usage ==
- Bustle is also the term used for an additional external space at the rear of a tank's turret used for storing extra equipment, a notable usage being the added box at the rear of the turret on the Sherman Firefly variant. Its positioning on the vehicle resembling the similar placement of the bustle as used on the dress item.
- In sailboat design, a bustle stern refers to any kind of stern that has a large "bustle" or blister at the waterline below the stern to prevent the stern from squatting when getting underway, or to a similar shape produced by the IOR measuring system.
- The term bustleback was used to describe cars styled with an additional rear protrusion that were produced in the early 1980s, such as the Cadillac Bustleback Seville.

== Gallery ==
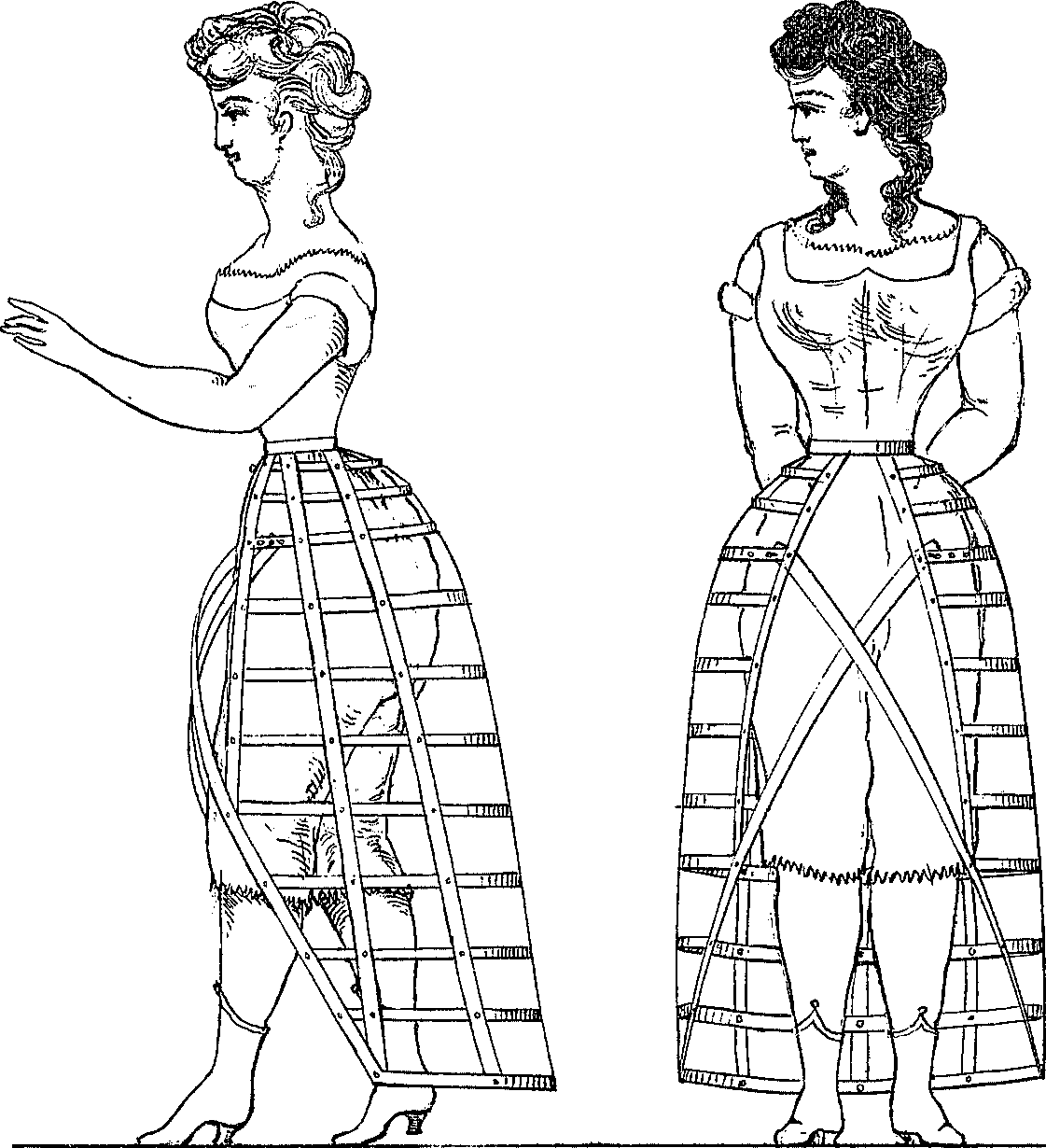
The crinolette

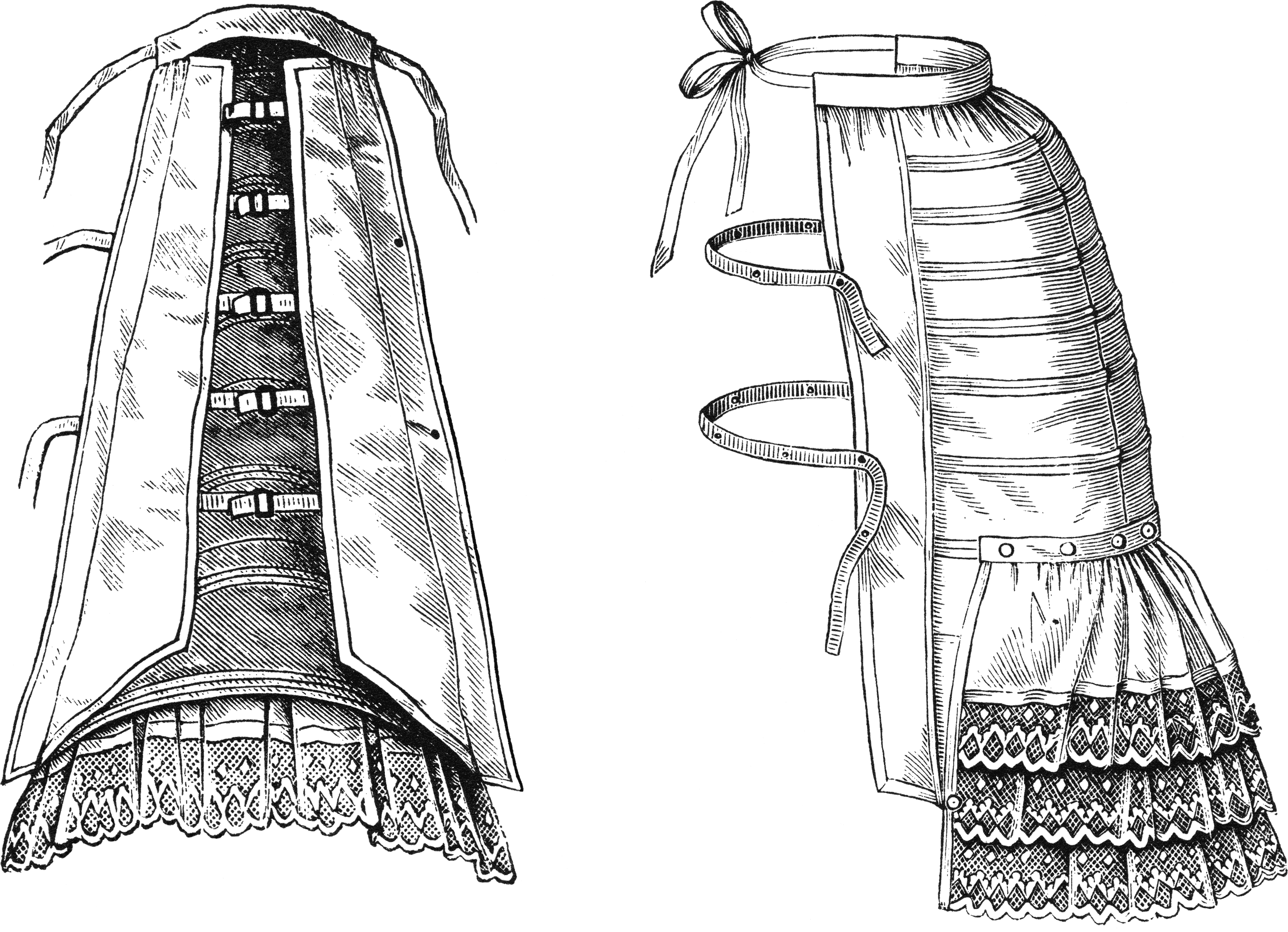
Bustle apparatus (1881)

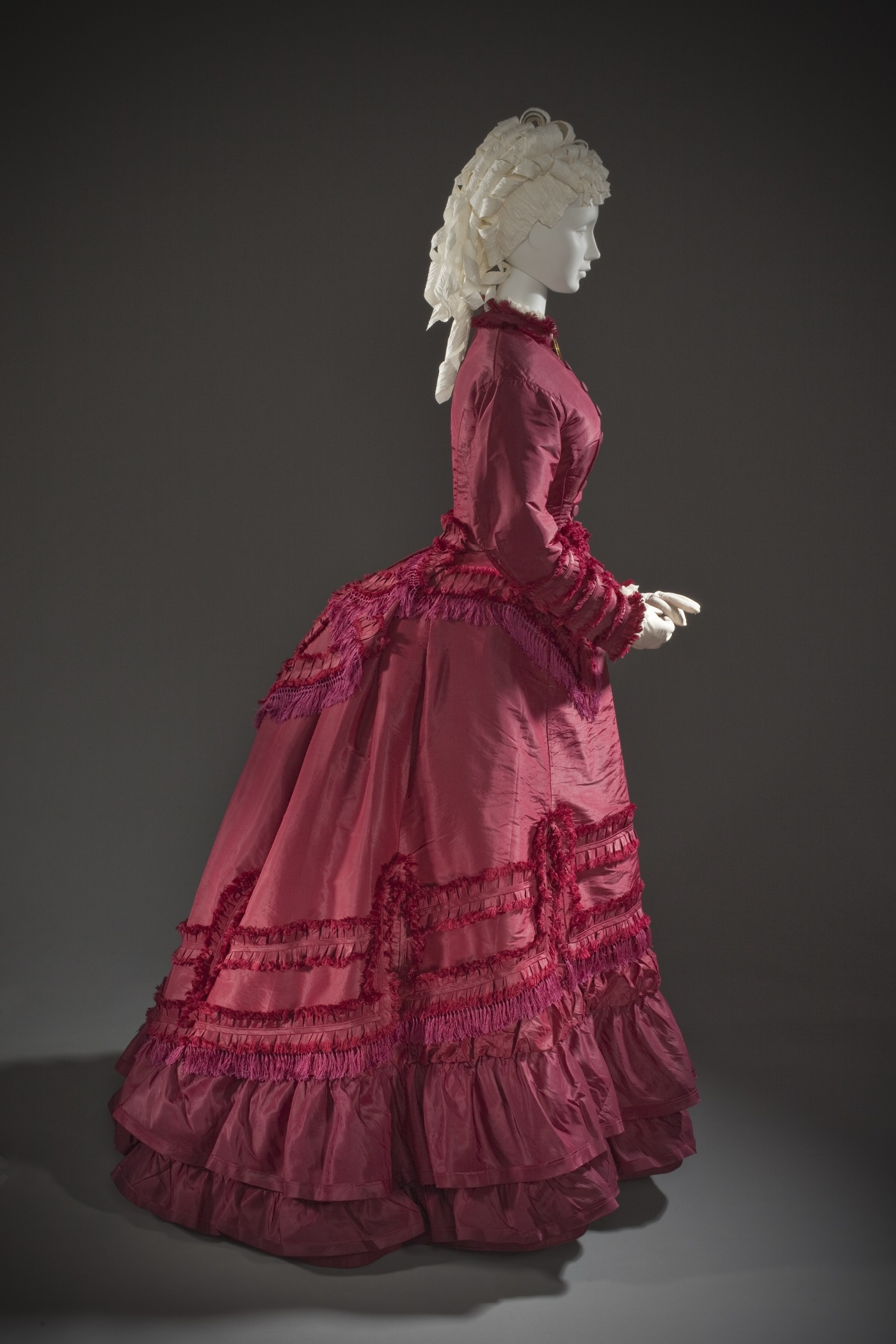
Bustle dress from 1870

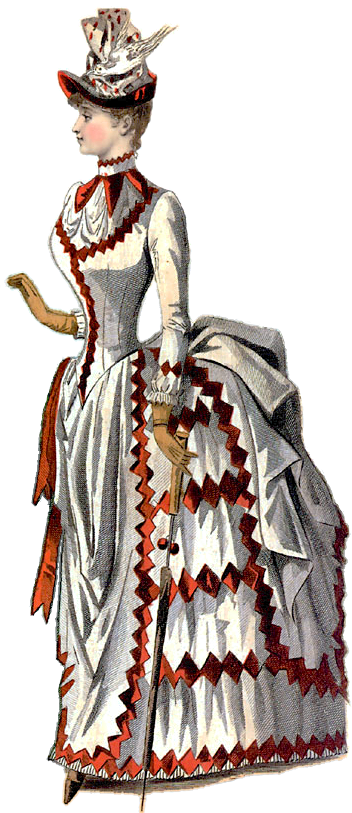
Mid-1880s fashion plate

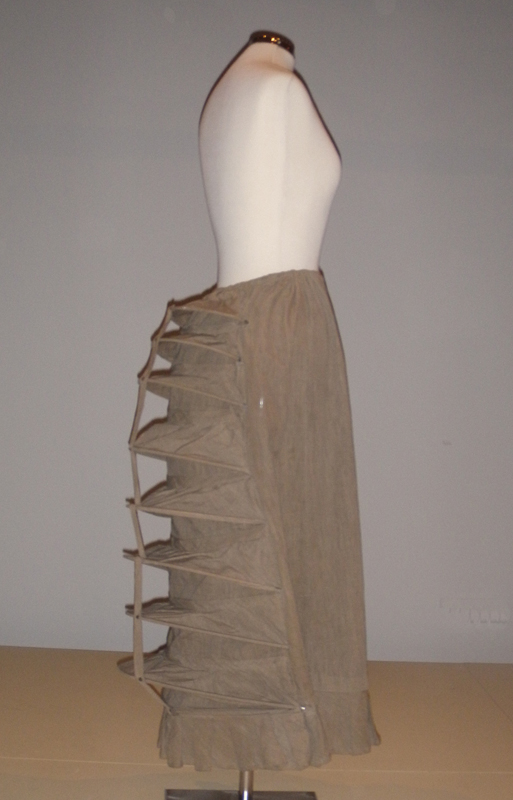

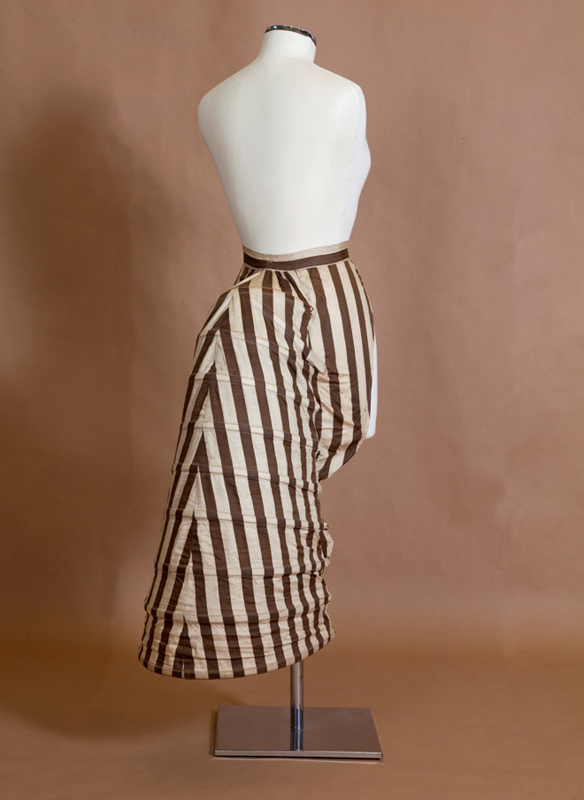
Bustle with brown and cream stripes, 1870s

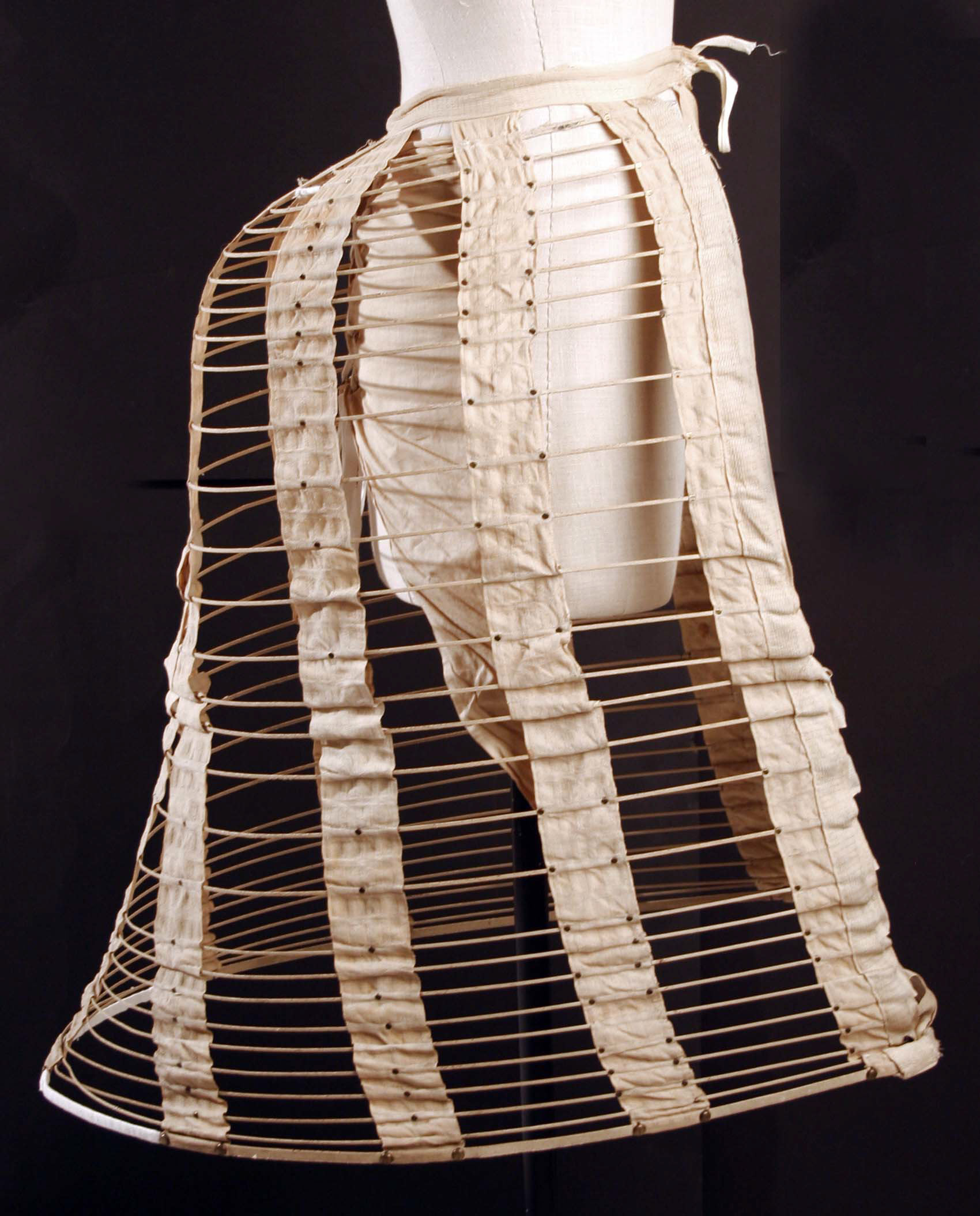

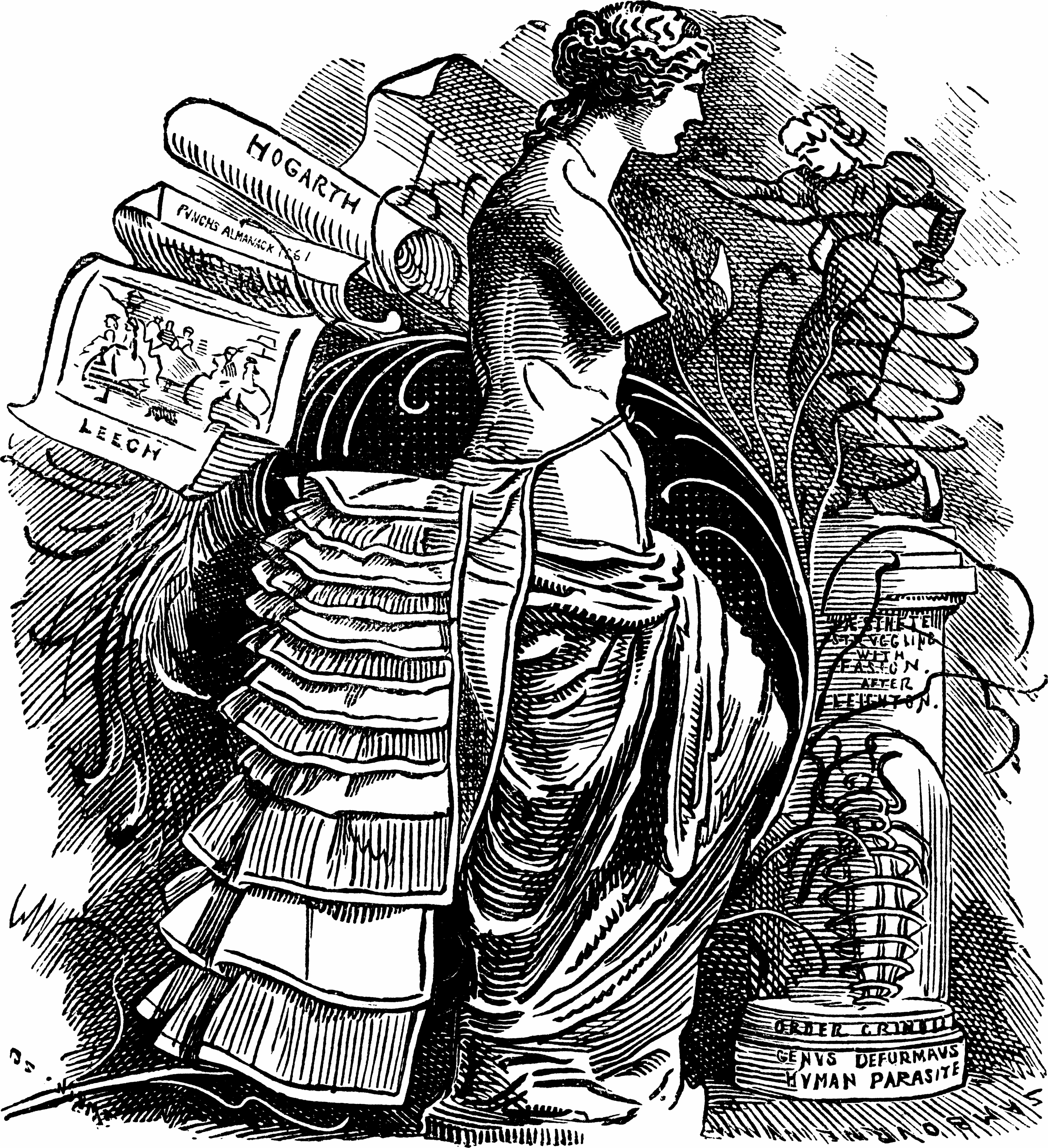
A criticism of the bustle fashion

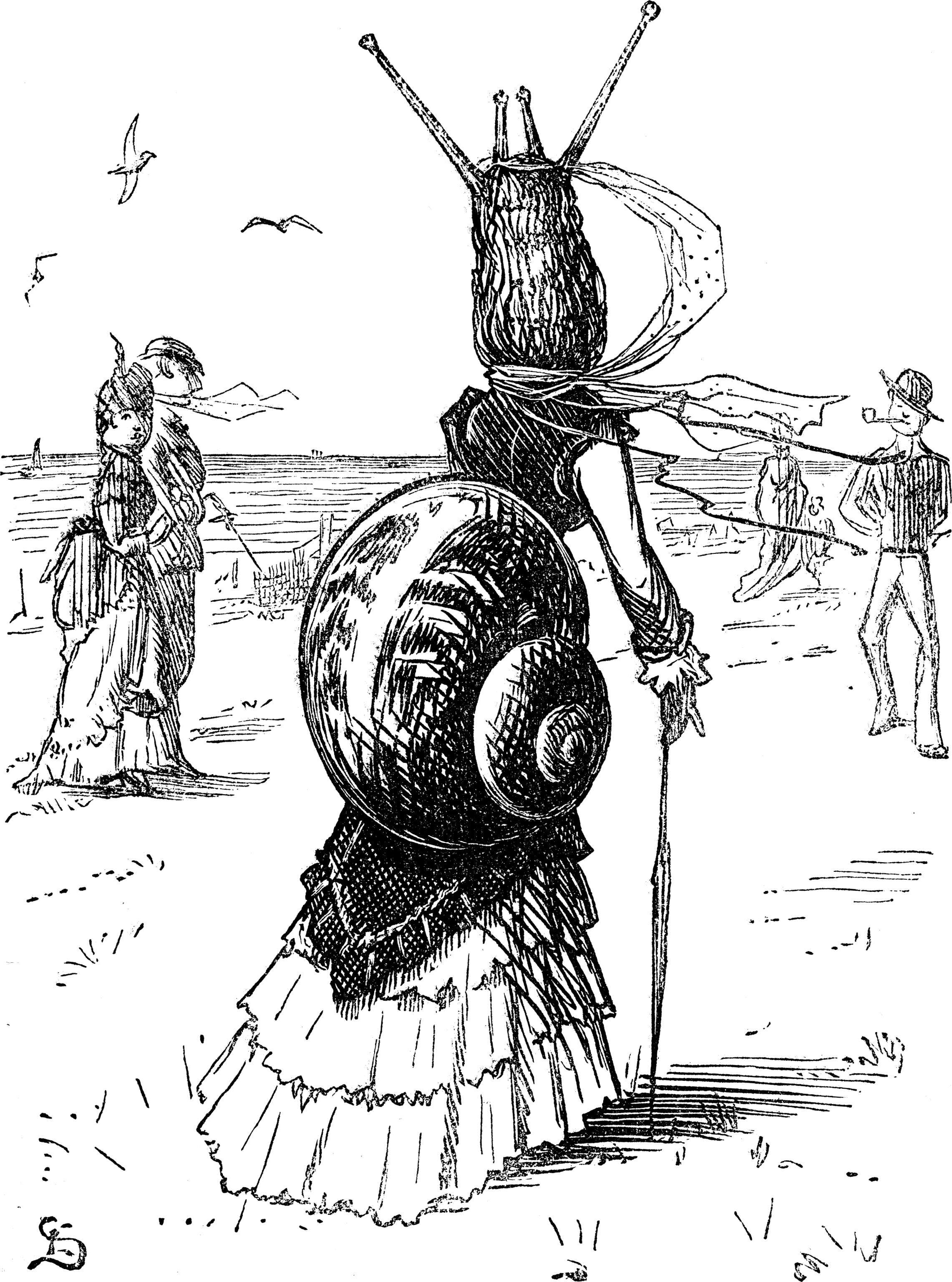
Satirical image comparing the look of a woman wearing a bustle to that of a snail wearing a dress

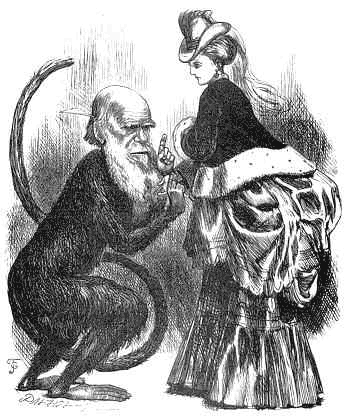
A caricature of Charles Darwin contemplating a bustle as a curiosity of natural history, from Fun, 16 November 1872

== See also ==
- 1870s in fashion
- 1880s in fashion
- Victorian fashion
