= Massimo Piattelli-Palmarini =

Italian scientist

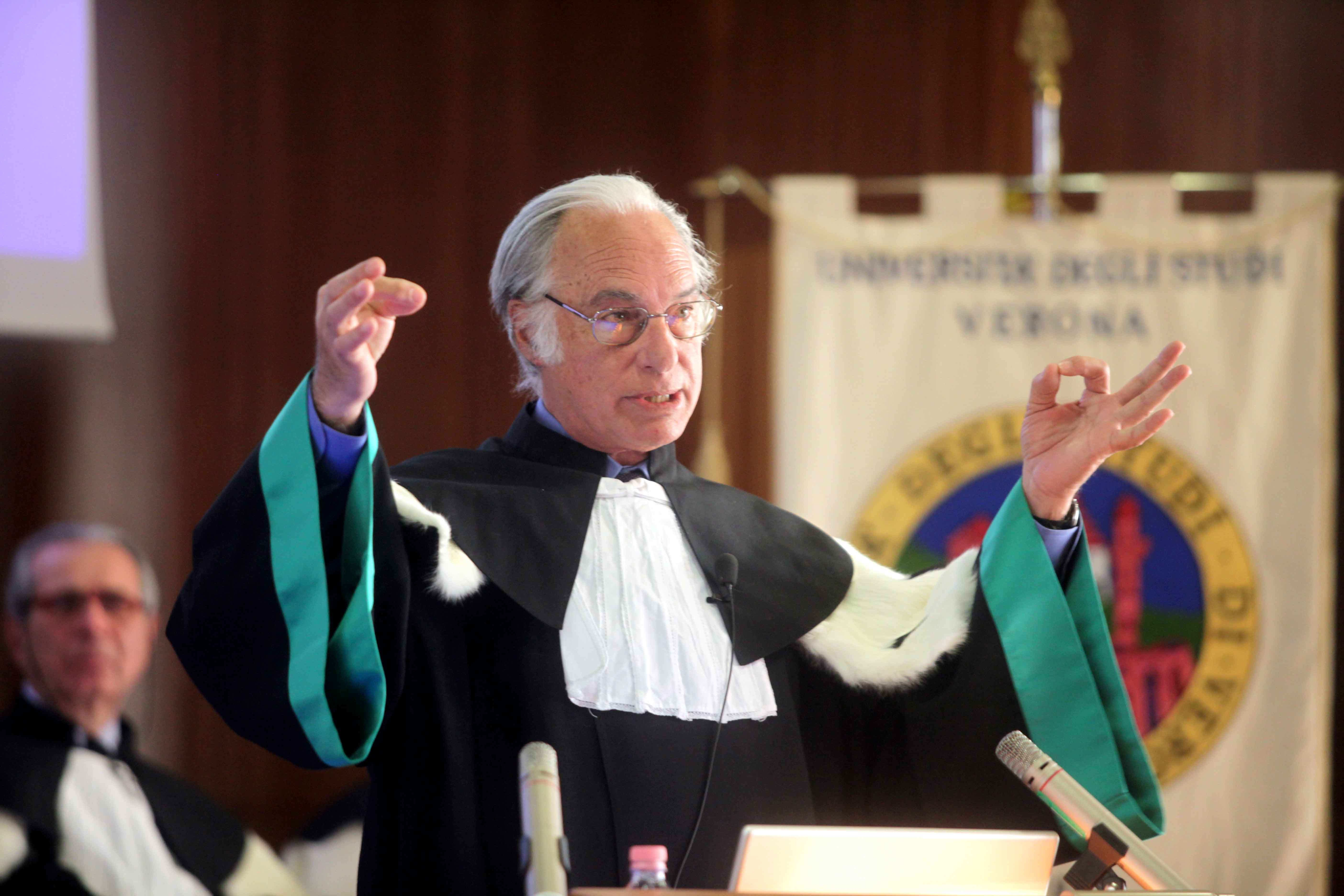
- Piattelli Palmarini during his keynote address, University of Verona, Inauguration of 2010 Academic Year.
- Born: 1942 (age 83–84); Rome, Italy
- Occupations: Professor of Linguistics and Cognitive Science
- Years active: 1999–present
- Employer: University of Arizona
- Known for: Biolinguistics
- Notable work: Inevitable Illusions: How Mistakes of Reason Rule our Minds • What Darwin Got Wrong

Massimo Piattelli-Palmarini is an Italian scientist. He acquired a PhD in Physics at the University of Rome in 1968 and has established the biolinguistic field.

== Career ==
Piantelli-Palmarini has been a professor of Cognitive Science at the University of Arizona since 1999. He was formerly the Principal Research Scientist at the Center for Cognitive Science at the Massachusetts Institute of Technology from 1985 to 1993.

In 2010, Piattelli-Palmarini and Jerry Fodor published the book What Darwin Got Wrong. The book, which argues that Darwinism is based on philosophical fallacies, was received negatively by multiple publications and biologists, and received mixed reviews from The Guardian. Mark Vernon of The Guardian named it the "Most Despised Science Book of the Year".

== Personal life ==
Piattelli-Palmarini is an atheist. He sailed for many years along the coasts of Italy, Southern France, Eastern United States and the Caribbean.
