= Darwinism =

Theory of biological evolution

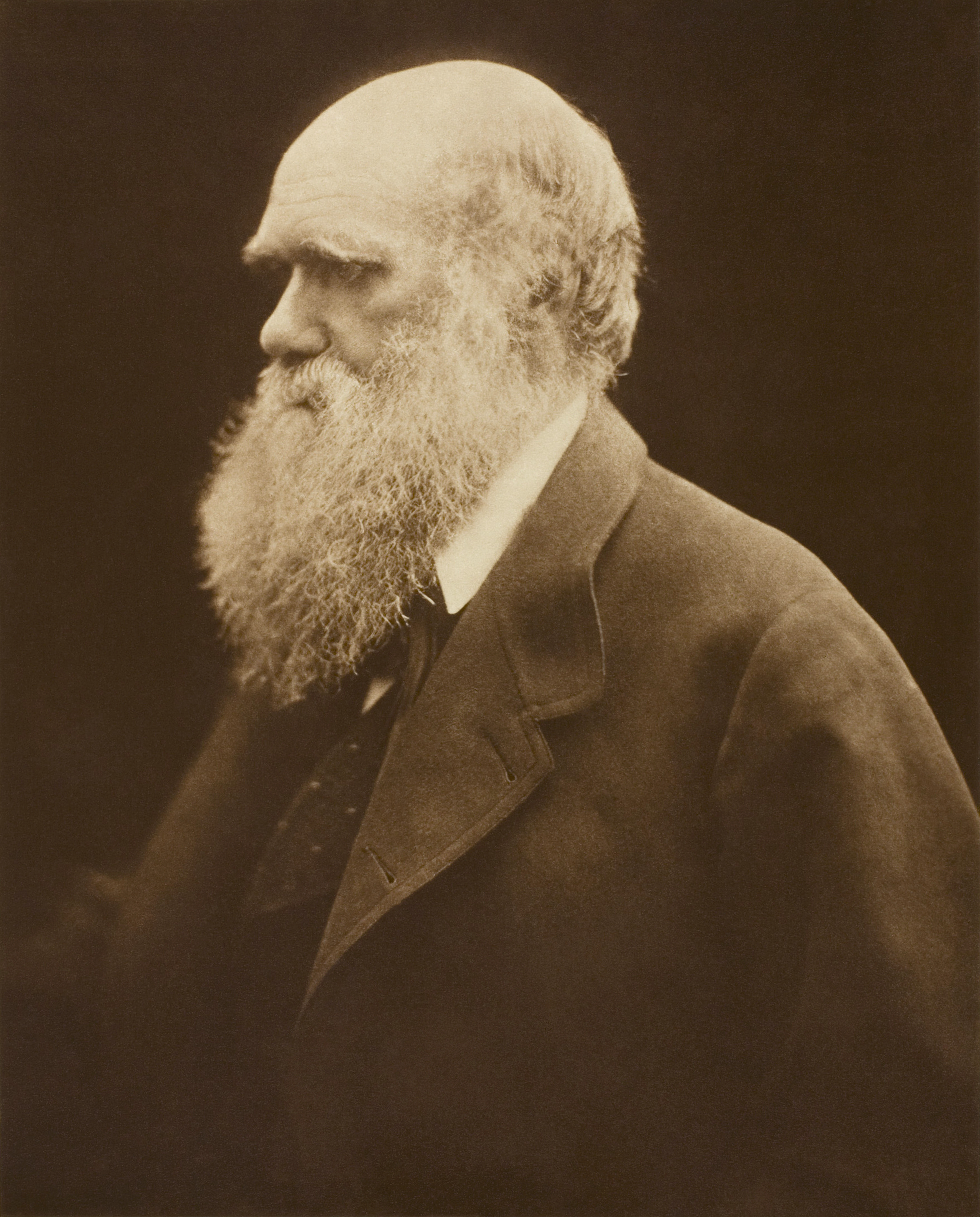
Charles Darwin in 1868

Darwinism is a term used to describe a theory of biological evolution developed by the English naturalist Charles Darwin (1809–1882) and his contemporaries. The theory states that all species of organisms arise and develop through the natural selection of small, inherited variations that increase the individual's ability to compete, survive, and reproduce. Also called Darwinian theory, it originally included the broad concepts of transmutation of species or of evolution which gained general scientific acceptance after Darwin published On the Origin of Species in 1859, including concepts which predated Darwin's theories. English biologist Thomas Henry Huxley coined the term Darwinism in April 1860.

Darwin's work lacked the clear theory of inheritance, which was provided by later neo-Darwinian theories such as the modern synthesis (which integrates mendelian inheritance).

== Terminology ==
English biologist Thomas Henry Huxley coined the term Darwinism in April 1860. It was used to describe evolutionary concepts in general, including earlier concepts published by English philosopher Herbert Spencer. Many of the proponents of Darwinism at that time, including Huxley, had reservations about the significance of natural selection, and Darwin himself gave credence to what was later called Lamarckism. The strict neo-Darwinism of German evolutionary biologist August Weismann gained few supporters in the late 19th century. During the approximate period of the 1880s to about 1920, sometimes called "the eclipse of Darwinism", scientists proposed various alternative evolutionary mechanisms which eventually proved untenable. The development of the modern synthesis in the early 20th century, incorporating natural selection with population genetics and Mendelian genetics, revived Darwinism in an updated form.

While the term Darwinism has remained in use amongst the public when referring to modern evolutionary theory, it has increasingly been argued by science writers such as Olivia Judson, Eugenie Scott, and Carl Safina that it is an inappropriate term for modern evolutionary theory. For example, Darwin was unfamiliar with the work of the Moravian scientist and Augustinian friar Gregor Mendel, and as a result had only a vague and inaccurate understanding of heredity. He naturally had no inkling of later theoretical developments and, like Mendel himself, knew nothing of genetic drift, for example.

In the United States and to some extent in the United Kingdom, creationists often use the term "Darwinism" as a pejorative term in reference to beliefs such as scientific materialism.

Though the term usually refers strictly to biological evolution, creationists have appropriated it to refer to the origin of life or to cosmic evolution, that are distinct to biological evolution, and therefore consider it to be the belief and acceptance of Darwin's and of his predecessors' work, in place of other concepts, including divine design and extraterrestrial origins.

== Huxley ==
As evolution became widely accepted in the 1870s, caricatures of Charles Darwin with the body of an ape or monkey symbolised evolution.

Huxley, upon first reading Darwin's theory in 1858, responded, "How extremely stupid not to have thought of that!"

While the term Darwinism had been used previously to refer to the work of Erasmus Darwin in the late 18th century, the term as understood today was introduced when Charles Darwin's 1859 book On the Origin of Species was reviewed by Thomas Henry Huxley in the April 1860 issue of The Westminster Review. Having hailed the book as "a veritable Whitworth gun in the armoury of liberalism" promoting scientific naturalism over theology, and praising the usefulness of Darwin's ideas while expressing professional reservations about Darwin's gradualism and doubting if it could be proved that natural selection could form new species, Huxley compared Darwin's achievement to that of Nicolaus Copernicus in explaining planetary motion:

What if the orbit of Darwinism should be a little too circular? What if species should offer residual phenomena, here and there, not explicable by natural selection? Twenty years hence naturalists may be in a position to say whether this is, or is not, the case; but in either event they will owe the author of "The Origin of Species" an immense debt of gratitude.... And viewed as a whole, we do not believe that, since the publication of Von Baer's "Researches on Development," thirty years ago, any work has appeared calculated to exert so large an influence, not only on the future of Biology, but in extending the domination of Science over regions of thought into which she has, as yet, hardly penetrated.

These are the basic tenets of evolution by natural selection as defined by Darwin:

1. More individuals are produced each generation than can survive.
2. Phenotypic variation exists among individuals and the variation is heritable.
3. Those individuals with heritable traits better suited to the environment will survive.
4. When reproductive isolation occurs new species will form.

== Other 19th-century usage ==
"Darwinism" soon came to stand for an entire range of evolutionary (and often revolutionary) philosophies about both biology and society. One of the more prominent approaches, summed in the 1864 phrase "survival of the fittest" by Herbert Spencer, later became emblematic of Darwinism even though Spencer's own understanding of evolution (as expressed in 1857) was more similar to that of Jean-Baptiste Lamarck than to that of Darwin, and predated the publication of Darwin's theory in 1859. What is now called "Social Darwinism" was, in its day, synonymous with "Darwinism"—the application of Darwinian principles of "struggle" to society, usually in support of anti-philanthropic political agenda. Another interpretation, one notably favoured by Darwin's half-cousin Francis Galton, was that "Darwinism" implied that because natural selection was apparently no longer working on "civilized" people, it was possible for "inferior" strains of people (who would normally be filtered out of the gene pool) to overwhelm the "superior" strains, and voluntary corrective measures would be desirable—the foundation of eugenics.

In Darwin's day there was no rigid definition of the term "Darwinism", and it was used by opponents and proponents of Darwin's biological theory alike to mean whatever they wanted it to in a larger context. The ideas had international influence, and Ernst Haeckel developed what was known as Darwinismus in Germany, although, like Spencer's "evolution", Haeckel's "Darwinism" had only a rough resemblance to the theory of Charles Darwin, and was not centred on natural selection. In 1886, Alfred Russel Wallace went on a lecture tour across the United States, starting in New York and going via Boston, Washington, Kansas, Iowa and Nebraska to California, lecturing on what he called "Darwinism" without any problems.

In his book Darwinism (1889), Wallace had used the term pure-Darwinism which proposed a "greater efficacy" for natural selection. George Romanes dubbed this view as "Wallaceism", noting that in contrast to Darwin, this position was advocating a "pure theory of natural selection to the exclusion of any supplementary theory." Taking influence from Darwin, Romanes was a proponent of both natural selection and the inheritance of acquired characteristics. The latter was denied by Wallace who was a strict selectionist. Romanes' definition of Darwinism conformed directly with Darwin's views and was contrasted with Wallace's definition of the term.

== Contemporary usage ==
The term Darwinism is often used in the United States by promoters of creationism, notably by leading members of the intelligent design movement, as an epithet to attack evolution as though it were an ideology (an "-ism") based on philosophical naturalism, atheism, or both. For example, in 1993, UC Berkeley law professor and author Phillip E. Johnson made this accusation of atheism with reference to Charles Hodge's 1874 book What Is Darwinism? However, unlike Johnson, Hodge confined the term to exclude those like American botanist Asa Gray who combined Christian faith with support for Darwin's natural selection theory, before answering the question posed in the book's title by concluding: "It is Atheism."

Creationists use pejoratively the term Darwinism to imply that the theory has been held as true only by Darwin and a core group of his followers, whom they cast as dogmatic and inflexible in their belief. In the 2008 documentary film Expelled: No Intelligence Allowed, which promotes intelligent design (ID), American writer and actor Ben Stein refers to scientists as Darwinists. Reviewing the film for Scientific American, John Rennie says "The term is a curious throwback, because in modern biology almost no one relies solely on Darwin's original ideas ... Yet the choice of terminology isn't random: Ben Stein wants you to stop thinking of evolution as an actual science supported by verifiable facts and logical arguments and to start thinking of it as a dogmatic, atheistic ideology akin to Marxism."

However, Darwinism is also used neutrally within the scientific community to distinguish the modern evolutionary synthesis, which is sometimes called "neo-Darwinism", from those first proposed by Darwin. Darwinism also is used neutrally by historians to differentiate his theory from other evolutionary theories current around the same period. For example, Darwinism may refer to Darwin's proposed mechanism of natural selection, in comparison to more recent mechanisms such as genetic drift and gene flow. It may also refer specifically to the role of Charles Darwin as opposed to others in the history of evolutionary thought—particularly contrasting Darwin's results with those of earlier theories such as Lamarckism or later ones such as the modern evolutionary synthesis.

In political discussions in the United States, the term is mostly used by its enemies. Biologist E. O. Wilson at Harvard University described the term as being "a rhetorical device to make evolution seem like a kind of faith, like 'Maoism [...] Scientists don't call it 'Darwinism'." In the United Kingdom, the term often retains its positive sense as a reference to natural selection, and for example British ethologist and evolutionary biologist Richard Dawkins wrote in his collection of essays A Devil's Chaplain, published in 2003, that as a scientist he is a Darwinist.

In his 1995 book Darwinian Fairytales, Australian philosopher David Stove used the term "Darwinism" in a different sense from the above examples. Describing himself as non-religious and as accepting the concept of natural selection as a well-established fact, Stove nonetheless attacked what he described as flawed concepts proposed by some "Ultra-Darwinists". Stove alleged that by using weak or false ad hoc reasoning, these Ultra-Darwinists used evolutionary concepts to offer explanations that were not valid: for example, Stove suggested that the sociobiological explanation of altruism as an evolutionary feature was presented in such a way that the argument was effectively immune to any criticism. English philosopher Simon Blackburn wrote a rejoinder to Stove, though a subsequent essay by Stove's protégé James Franklin suggested that Blackburn's response actually "confirms Stove's central thesis that Darwinism can 'explain' anything."

In more recent times, the Australian moral philosopher and professor Peter Singer, who serves as the Ira W. DeCamp Professor of Bioethics at Princeton University, has proposed the development of a "Darwinian left" based on the contemporary scientific understanding of biological anthropology, human evolution, and applied ethics in order to achieve the establishment of a more equal and cooperative human society in accordance with the sociobiological explanation of altruism.

== Esoteric usage ==
In evolutionary aesthetics theory, there is evidence that perceptions of beauty are determined by natural selection and therefore Darwinian; that things, aspects of people and landscapes considered beautiful are typically found in situations likely to give enhanced survival of the perceiving human's genes.

== See also ==
- Darwin Awards
- Evidence of common descent
- History of evolutionary thought
- Modern evolutionary synthesis
- Neural Darwinism
- Pangenesis—Charles Darwin's hypothetical mechanism for heredity
- Social Darwinism
- Speciation
- Universal Darwinism

== Sources ==
- Bowler, Peter J. (2003). Evolution: The History of an Idea (3rd completely rev. and expanded ed.). Berkeley, CA: University of California Press. ISBN 0-520-23693-9. LCCN 2002007569. OCLC 49824702.
- Browne, Janet (2002). Charles Darwin: The Power of Place. Vol. 2. London: Jonathan Cape. ISBN 0-679-42932-8. LCCN 94006598. OCLC 733100564.
- Hodge, Charles (1874). What is Darwinism?. New York: Scribner, Armstrong, and Company. LCCN 06012878. OCLC 11489956.
- Huxley, Thomas Henry (1893). Darwiniana: Essays. Macmillan and Company.
- Petto, Andrew J.; Godfrey, Laurie R., eds. (2007) [Originally published 2007 as Scientists Confront Intelligent Design and Creationism]. Scientists Confront Creationism: Intelligent Design and Beyond. New York: W. W. Norton & Company. ISBN 978-0-393-33073-1. LCCN 2006039753. OCLC 173480577.
- Stove, David (1995). Darwinian Fairytales. Avebury Series in Philosophy. Aldershot, Hants, England; Brookfield, VT: Avebury. ISBN 1-85972-306-3. LCCN 95083037. OCLC 35145565.
