= Portraits of Charles Darwin =

There are many known portraits of Charles Darwin. Darwin came from a wealthy family and became a well-known naturalist and author, and portraits were made of him in childhood, adulthood and old age. Darwin's life (1809–1882) spanned the development of photography, and early portraits of Darwin are drawn or painted, while many later portraits are monochrome photographs. After the publication and dissemination of the controversial On the Origin of Species in 1859, Darwin was also the subject of numerous caricatures.

Darwin's visage, particularly his iconic beard, continues to be culturally significant and widely recognisable into the 21st century. According to historian Janet Browne, Darwin's capacity to commission photographs of himself—and their widespread reproduction as carte de visite and cabinet card photographs—helped to cement the lasting connection between Darwin and the theory of evolution in popular thought (largely to the exclusion of the many others who also contributed to the development of evolutionary theory), especially as these portraits were reinterpreted in caricature. At that time few could afford to commission portrait photographs, and this gave Darwin an advantage in gaining public recognition.

Especially in his last decades, as his illness progressed, Darwin expressed frustration about sitting for photographs. He turned down an opportunity in 1869 to sit for a portrait with Alfred Russel Wallace, explaining that sitting for photographs "is what I hate doing & wastes a whole day owing to my weak health; and to sit with another person would cause still more trouble & delay." Nevertheless, there are at least 53 known photographs of Darwin, according to Gene Kritsky, a scholar of Darwin photos.

== Chronological list of portraits ==
Year	Creator	Image	Notes
1816	Ellen Sharples		Chalk drawing of Charles (age six) and his sister Catherine
late 1830s	George Richmond		Water-colour portrait from after Darwin's return from the voyage of the Beagle
1842			Daguerreotype of Darwin (age 33) with his son William, reproduced in The Life, Letters, and Labours of Francis Galton by Karl Pearson
1849	Thomas Herbert Maguire		
1853	Samuel Laurence		Pastel chalk drawing of Darwin by Samuel Laurence
probably 1854	Henry Maull and [John] Fox		A portrait by Maull & Fox, probably taken when Darwin was 45, which was used as the frontispiece of Francis Darwin's The Life and Letters of Charles Darwin (1887), with the caption "From a Photograph (1854?) by Messrs. Maull. And Fox. Engraved for Harper's Magazine, October 1884." In an 1899 paper, Francis Darwin wrote that "The date of the photograph is probably 1854; it is, however, impossible to be certain on this point, the books of Messrs. Maull and Fox having been destroyed by fire. The reproduction is by Mr. Dew-Smith, who has been at some disadvantage, having only an old and faded print to work from." The photograph was reproduced in The Life, Letters, and Labours of Francis Galton (1914-24-30) by Karl Pearson who wrote that it showed Darwin at the age of 51, which would date it to 1859 or 1860.
c. 1855	Maull & Polyblank (photography partnership of Henry Maull and George Henry Polyblank		Portrait for the Literary and Scientific Portrait Club about which Darwin wrote in a 27 May 1855 letter: "if I really have as bad an expression, as my photograph gives me, how I can have one single friend is surprising."
c. 1866	Ernest Edwards (1837–1903)		
c. 1866	Ernest Edwards (1837–1903)		
1867	Ernest Edwards (1837–1903)		
1867	Ernest Edwards (1837–1903)		
1867	André Gill		
1868	Julia Margaret Cameron		
1868	Julia Margaret Cameron		
1869	Attributed to Julia Margaret Cameron, although it has been suggested that this is a reversed image of a photograph taken by Leonard Darwin in the 1870s.		
1869	Julia Margaret Cameron		
1869	Laura Russell (1816–1885)		oil on canvas
c. 1871	Oscar Gustave Rejlander		
1871	The Hornet artist		"A Venerable Orang-outang", a caricature from 22 March 1871 issue of The Hornet magazine
1871	"Coïdé", a.k.a. James Jacques Joseph Tissot		"Natural Selection", a Vanity Fair caricature from 30 September 1871 issue
1874	Elliott & Fry		
1874 or c. 1880	Elliott & Fry		Harvard dates this to 1874; Other sources give circa 1880.
unknown	unknown [possibly Elliott & Fry]; published by John G. Murdoch		A Woodburytype carte de visite
unknown	Elliott & Fry		
unknown	unknown		
c. 1874	Leonard Darwin		Numerous photographs were taken by Darwin's son Leonard, who was an avid amateur photographer.
1875	Walter William Ouless (1848–1933)		A painting by W. W. Ouless that hangs in Darwin College at Cambridge University
c. 1875	Elliott & Fry		
late 1870s	Elliott & Fry		
1877	Lock & Whitfield		
1878	Marion Collier (née Huxley) (1859–1887)		Pencil sketch
unknown	unknown		
1880s	Herbert Rose Barraud		
1881	Elliott & Fry		
1881	Elliott & Fry		
29 November 1881	Elliott & Fry		
1881	Punch artist		"Man is But a Worm", including a caricature of Darwin, from the 1882 Punch almanac. It was published soon after Darwin's last book The Formation of Vegetable Mould through the Action of Worms.
1881 (copied in 1883)	John Collier		A copy made by John Collier in 1883 of his 1881 portrait of Charles Darwin. According to Darwin's son Erasmus, "The picture is a replica of the one in the rooms in the Linnaean Society and was made by Collier after the original. I took some trouble about it and as a likeness it is an improvement on the original."
1881	Herbert Rose Barraud (1845–1896)		Photograph by Herbert Rose Barraud, thought by Darwin photograph scholar Gene Kritsky to be the last photograph taken of Darwin before his death in 1882. The original photograph is held by the Huntington Library, San Marino, California.
Between 1880 and 1910	Harry Furniss		A pen and ink caricature by illustrator Harry Furniss
