= Beyond Natural Selection =

1991 book by Robert G. Wesson

- Cover
- Author: Robert G. Wesson
- Language: English
- Subject: Evolution
- Publisher: MIT Press
- Publication date: 1991, 1993
- Media type: Print
- Pages: 369

Beyond Natural Selection is a 1991 book by Robert G. Wesson, published by MIT Press.

Wesson argues for the case of pluralism in biology. He suggests alternative mechanisms of evolution rather than natural selection. Wesson argues that reductionism is inadequate and looks for chaos theory as an example of a different approach that is needed to explain evolution. The book provides unsolved problems that Wesson believed natural selection could not account for.

== Reception ==
The paleontologist Joseph G. Carter in a critical review for the American Scientist wrote the book "includes innumerable oversimplifications and misrepresentations of both evolutionary theory and the paleontological record." Carter noted that the book was filled with errors such as Wesson's claim there is a lack of transitional fossils. Carter wrote that the "book approaches the scientific illiteracy" of the intelligent design text Of Pandas and People, and concluded it was an "embarrassment to the editors of the MIT Press".

The ecologist Arthur M. Shapiro in a review for The Quarterly Review of Biology negatively reviewed the book for misunderstanding evolutionary biology and poor scholarship. According to Shapiro he "found an average of just over one error... per page by checking pages of this book at random."

The historian Peter J. Bowler compared the book to anti-Darwinian and creationist works. He criticized the book for utilizing straw man arguments and presenting no valid scientific alternative to natural selection. Bowler noted that it is "easy to criticize an established theory, much more difficult to come up with a workable alternative... Hand waving about the creative power of the organism makes a nice-sounding philosophical position but a poor scientific theory".
