= Term (argumentation) =

Part of a statement referring to something

In argumentation theory, a term (or notion) is that part of a statement in an argument which refers to a specific thing. A term is usually, but not always expressed as a noun. According to Essentials of Logic, the word is derived from the Latin "terminus."

One of the requirements to informally prove a conclusion with a deductive argument is for all its terms to be used unambiguously. The ambiguous use of a term in a deductive argument may be an instance of the fallacy of four terms.
