= Darwinian Fairytales =

1995 book by David Stove

- Cover of the second edition
- Author: David Stove
- Language: English
- Subject: Theory of evolution
- Publisher: Avebury
- Publication date: 1995
- Media type: Print (Hardcover)

Darwinian Fairytales is a 1995 book by the philosopher David Stove, in which the author criticizes application of the theory of evolution as an explanation for sociobiological behavior such as altruism.

The book was originally published by Avebury in 1995 and republished by Encounter Books in 2006.

== Reception ==
Criticism of the book has come from the biologist Michael Ghiselin:

"Much of what he says is completely wrong. According to his version, organisms invariably reproduce as much as possible. And yet, contrary to what he says, there is nothing contrary to the theory as it is taught to undergraduate biology students, when older males prevents younger ones from getting access to females. It is straight-forward consequence of competition for a finite number of mates. Nor does there exist, as he claims, any contradiction in the fact that organisms defer reproduction until they reach a certain age and size; they are accumulating capital."

== See also ==
- Darwinism
- Richard Dawkins
- The Selfish Gene
- Memes
