= Caricatures of Charles Darwin and his evolutionary theory in 19th-century England =

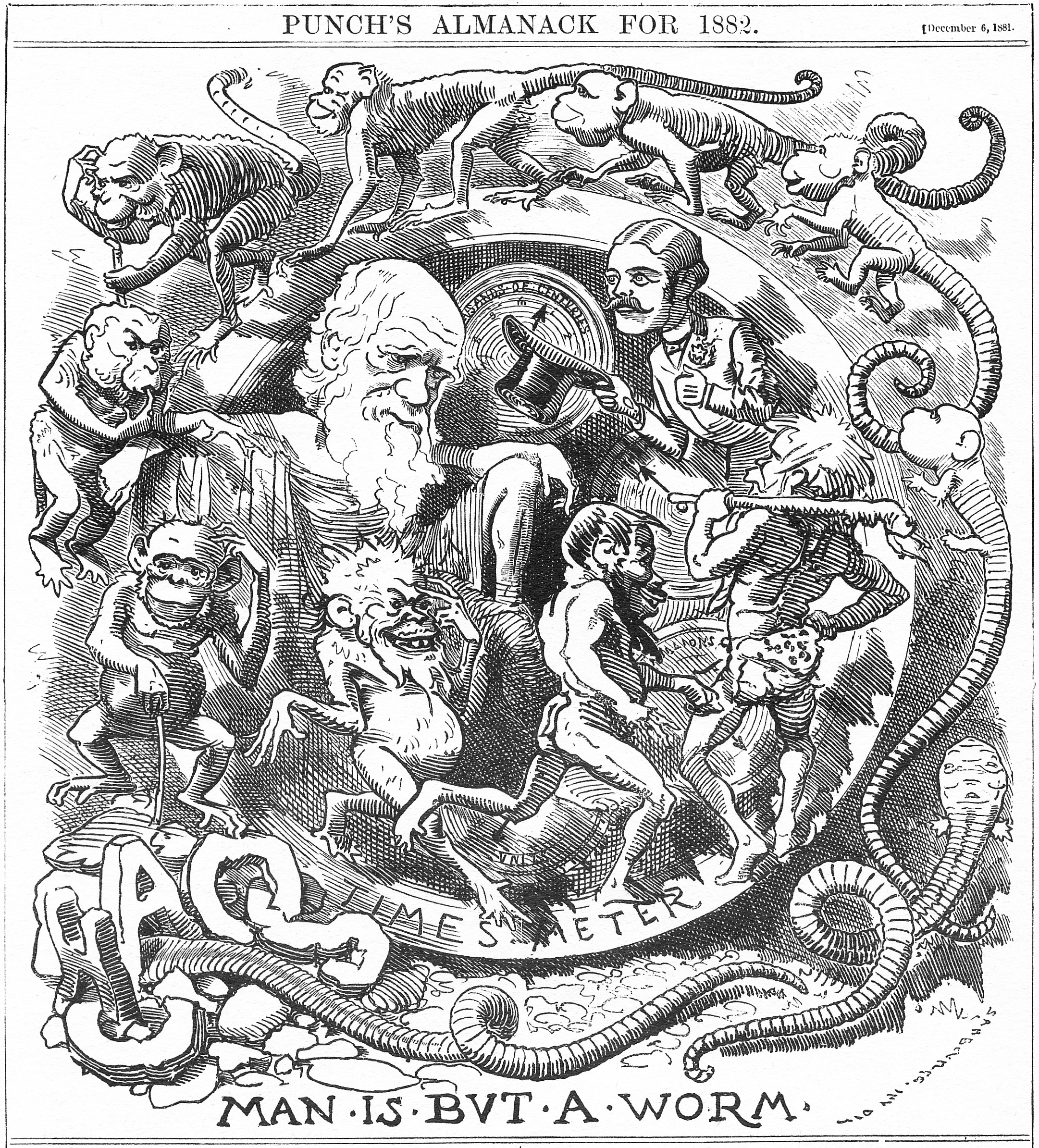
Shortly after the Publication of The Formation of Vegetable Mould Through the Action of Worms, Linley Sambourne's cartoon Man Is But a Worm was published in Punch's Almanack. It depicts the evolution of the worm into the human – in this case, the English gentleman – as a means of ridiculing Darwin's theory.

Before Charles Darwin and his groundbreaking theory of evolution, primates were mainly used as caricatures of human nature. Although comparisons between man and animal are rather old, it was not until the findings of science that mankind recognised itself as a part of the animal kingdom (however, in some religious beliefs, mankind still plays a unique role above animals and is not considered part of the animal kingdom). Caricatures of Darwin and his evolutionary theory reveal how closely science was intertwined with both the arts and the public during the Victorian era. They display the general perception of Darwin, his "monkey theory" and apes in 19th-century England.

The caricatures provide not only insights into the public perception of Darwin's evolutionary theory but also played an essential part in its dissemination and popularisation. During the 1860s and 1870s the kinship between ape and man received far more opposition than it would in the following century, with the theory of natural selection today considered a subject of universal scientific consensus.

== Notable images ==
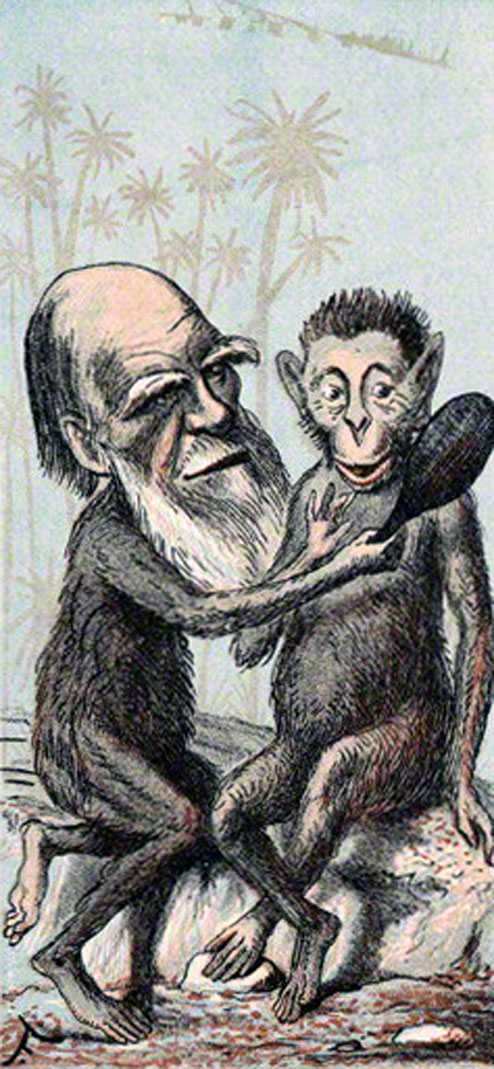
Prof. Darwin in Figaro's London Sketch Book of Celebrities, 18 February 1874.

=== Professor Darwin ===
We see Darwin portrayed as a monkey with his own human head. He holds a mirror up to another monkey which is sitting next to him. It seems as if he would invite the monkey to ponder over himself and his existence. This is underlined by the two accompanying quotations of Shakespeare: "This is the ape of form" (from: Love's Labour's Lost, act 5, scene 2) and "Some four or five descents since" (All's Well that Ends Well, act 3, scene 7). Darwin's facial expression seems to encourage the monkey to recognise their common ancestry. The ape, in turn, looks into the mirror and tries to touch the reflection to literally grasp Darwin's suggestion and to assure himself of the authenticity of their kinship.

=== Man Is But a Worm ===
Linley Sambourne drew a "wild evolutionary polonaise" which spirals up from "CHAOS" and ends in the English gentleman tipping his top hat to Darwin, the latter enthroned observing the entire development from the center. Among the stages in the process are the earthworm, the monkey and the cave man. Clocks are displayed in the background; the path on which the evolution proceeds is labelled as "times meter" both indicating that the evolution is depicted in time lapse. Darwin resembles one of the figures of Michelangelo's ceiling fresco in the Sistine Chapel.

== Interpretations ==
=== Professor Darwin ===
This caricature offers various starting points for an art-historical analysis. It was published three years after Darwin's work The Descent of Man (1871). Here, Darwin finally takes a stand and argues that humans and monkeys share a common ancestor. In the caricature, however, this view is put into question. Moreover, it goes back on the widespread assumption that humans exhibit certain animal features – the ape as a mirror for humankind so to speak. In this respect the caricature stands also in the tradition of vanitas which is symbolised by the hand mirror reflecting human vanity. The fact that the ape-like Darwin is holding the mirror and not the real ape shows that Darwin and his theory should be ridiculed. Darwin himself has acknowledged that "[he] has given man a pedigree of prodigious length, but not, it may be said, of noble quality." Consequently, the ape is not enhanced in status through his kinship with man.

After the publication of The Descent of Man Darwin was increasingly identified with the theory of evolution although his friend Thomas Henry Huxley was the first to put it forward. As a result, Darwin himself was considered more and more as a suitable object to caricature. The cover of the French satirical magazine La Petite Lune is a telling example of the paradigmatic representation of Darwin in contemporary cartoons and caricatures.

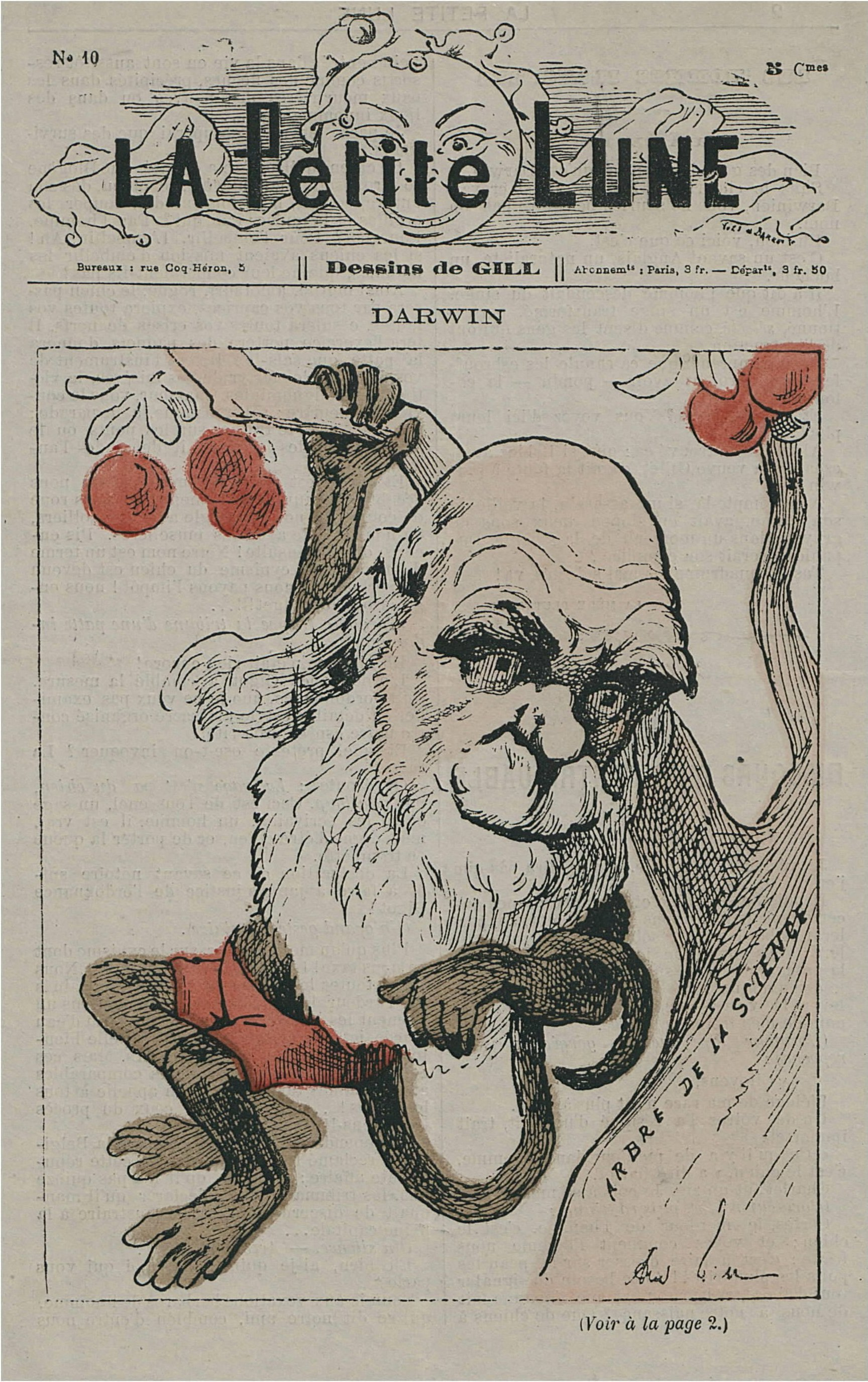
Front page of the French satirical magazine La Petite Lune by André Gill (1871?).

=== Man Is But a Worm ===
Sambourne's caricature deals in a playful manner with the topics "evolution" and "descent of man." The title alludes to a publication of Darwin entitled The Formation of Vegetable Mould through the Action of Worms, with Observations of their Habits which was issued in October 1881. In the caricature, evolution is associated with metamorphosis and portrayed as a gradual process which inevitably leads to advancement. This, however, conveys a reduced if not false picture of Darwin's theory in which competition, hereditary transmission, coincidence and selection play a major role. Besides, these circular images of evolutionary progression form a striking contrast to Darwin's own linear and branching evolutionary trees. In The Origin of Species Darwin "took pains to emphasize that evolution was neither progressive nor circular."

That the earthworm is transformed into a monkey and not into another animal might indicate that the thesis of a kinship between ape and human received a wider acceptance among the British public (The Descent of Man had been published 10 years earlier). Still, the monkey is depicted as the underdeveloped version of a human. At the same time, however, the "superior" human being or rather the English gentleman is ridiculed: he too is descended from an earthworm.

== Precursors and reception ==
Precursors for the depiction of anthropomorphic animals were the works of Grandville who portrayed individuals for example in Les Métamorphoses du jour (1828–29) with the bodies of men and faces of animals. The caricatures of Charles Philipon can also be considered as a role model for the illustrators of Punch and other English satirical magazines. The cyclical depiction of Darwin's evolutionary theory might have been modelled on the wood engravings of the illustrator Charles H. Bennett which show transformations of humans into immobile objects and vice versa.

== Origin ==
- The caricature Prof. Darwin was published on 18 February 1874 three years after the publication of Darwin's seminal work The Descent of Man in Figaro's London Sketch Book of Celebrities. The artist is unknown.
- Man Is But a Worm, a caricature by Edward Linley Sambourne, was printed in Punch's Almanack for 1882 on 6 December 1881.
- A drawing done by Edward Linley Sambourne references Darwin. This drawing was titled, "Man is But a Worm." On 6 December 1881, this drawing was put into Punch's Almanac.

== See also ==
- Reactions to On the Origin of Species
- Portraits of Charles Darwin
